= Hydrogeophysics =

Cross-discipline of geophysics and hydrology

Hydrogeophysics is a cross-disciplinary area of research that uses geophysics to determine parameters (characteristics; measurements of limitations or boundaries) and monitor processes for hydrological studies of matters such as water resources, contamination, and ecological studies. The field uses knowledge and researchers from geology, hydrology, physics, geophysics, engineering, statistics, and rock physics. It uses geophysics to provide quantitative information about hydrogeological parameters, using minimally invasive methods. Hydrogeophysics differs from geophysics in its specific uses and methods. Although geophysical knowledge and methods have existed and grown over the last half century for applications in mining and petroleum industries, hydrogeological study sites have different subsurface conditions than those industries. Thus, the geophysical methods for mapping subsurface properties combine with hydrogeology to use proper, accurate methods to map shallow hydrological study sites.

== Background ==
The field of hydrogeophysics developed out of a need to use minimally invasive methods for determining and studying hydrogeological parameters and processes. Determination of hydrogeological parameters is important for finding water resources, which is a growing need, and learning about water contamination, which has become relevant with the growing use of potentially hazardous chemicals.

The methods and knowledge of geophysics had been developed for mining and petroleum industries, which involve consolidated subsurface environments with high pressure and temperature. Since the subsurface environments in hydrogeological studies are less consolidated and have low temperature and pressure, combining geophysics with hydrogeology was necessary to develop proper geophysical methods that work for hydrological purposes.

Traditional hydrogeological methods for characterizing the subsurface usually involved drilling and taking soil samples from the site, which can disturb the study site, cost too much time or money, or expose researchers and people to harmful chemicals and contaminants. They also only provide localized information, rather than the necessary field-scale information. Using geophysical methods and digital technology allows hydrogeologists to more quickly study hydrological characteristics on a larger scale with a lower cost and less invasive techniques.

A Hydrogeophysics Advanced Study Institute was held at the Trest Castle in the Czech Republic in July 2002 and funded by NATO when they acknowledged the necessity for fully developed, minimally invasive procedures for investigating and monitoring hydrogeological processes and parameters in shallow subsurface conditions. The institute brought together geophysicists working in hydrogeological characterization with hydrogeologists interested in using geophysical methods and data for characterization. This group, plus other international researchers, discussed the possibilities and challenges of using geophysical methods for investigating hydrogeological parameters.

They determined the main obstacles of hydrogeophysics are gaps in the knowledge and understanding of the correlation between hydrogeological parameters and geophysical characteristics, and difficulty in being able to integrate those different sets of information. One of the biggest challenges is using an organized, methodical, and efficient way to combine geophysical and hydrogeological data sets that measure different parameters over different spatial scales. This is the largest obstacle because the foundation of hydrogeophysics is integrating hydrogeology with geophysics.

== Methods ==
There are many different methods for determining subsurface properties and features that can be done from different locations/ proximities to the study sites:

- Electric and electromagnetic methods (surface, airborne) - measuring the resistivity of the subsurface
- Remote sensing (airborne)- mapping bedrock, water interfaces, and water quality assessment
- Seismic refraction (surface)- mapping top of bedrock, faults, and water table
- Seismic reflection (surface)- mapping top of bedrock, boundaries of faults and fracture zones, and stratigraphy
- Ground-penetrating radar (surface)- mapping stratigraphy and water table; monitoring water content
- Hydraulic tomography (crosshole)- measuring hydraulic conductivity
- Neutron probe (wellbore)- monitoring water content
- Permeameter (laboratory)- measuring hydraulic conductivity
- Sieves (laboratory)- estimation of hydraulic conductivity
- Time-domain reflectometer (laboratory)- measuring water content

== Applications ==
Geophysics helps to learn about many hydrogeological matters such as:

- Determining aquifer geometry
- Determining fractured rock characteristics- faults/fissures and fluid circulation characteristics
- Gaining knowledge of an aquifer's hydraulic properties- transimissivity (rate at which groundwater flows through aquifer horizontally), porosity, and permeability (measure of the ability of a porous material to allow fluid to flow through)
- Determining water quality
- Monitoring dynamic processes- seepage through the vadose zone

These parameters are then used to investigate matters including searching for underground water resources, aquifer control or contamination from sea water or industrial sources, and storing harmful substances underground. Having a good measurement of these hydrogeological parameters helps to better understand water contamination transport and develop more sustainable water resources.
