= Isotope hydrology =

Field of geochemistry and hydrology

Isotope hydrology is a field of geochemistry and hydrology that uses naturally occurring stable and radioactive isotopic techniques to evaluate the age and origins of surface and groundwater and the processes within the atmospheric hydrologic cycle. Isotope hydrology applications are highly diverse, and used for informing water-use policy, mapping aquifers, conserving water supplies, assessing sources of water pollution, investigating surface-groundwater interaction, refining groundwater flow models, and increasingly are used in eco-hydrology to study human impacts on all dimensions of the hydrological cycle and ecosystem services.

== Details ==
Water molecules carry unique isotopic "fingerprints", based in part on differing ratios of the oxygen and hydrogen isotopes that constitute the water molecule. Isotopes are atoms of the same element that have a different number of neutrons in their nuclei.

Air, freshwater and seawater contain mostly oxygen-16 ( ^{16}O). Oxygen-18 (^{18}O) occurs in approximately one oxygen atom in every five hundred and has a slightly higher mass than oxygen-16, as it has two extra neutrons. From a simple energy and bond breakage standpoint this results in a preference for evaporating the lighter ^{16}O containing water and leaving more of the ^{18}O water behind in the liquid state (called isotope fractionation). Thus seawater tends to contain more ^{18}O than rain and snow.

Dissolved ions in surface and groundwater also contain useful isotopes for hydrological investigations. Dissolved species like sulfate and nitrate contain differing ratios of 34-S to 32-S or 15-N to 14-N, and are often diagnostic of pollutant sources. Natural radioisotopes like tritium (3-H) and radiocarbon (14-C) are also used as natural clocks to determine the residence times of water in aquifers, rivers, and the oceans.

== Applications ==
The most commonly used isotope application in hydrology uses hydrogen and oxygen isotopes to evaluate sources or age of water, ice or snow. Isotopes in ice cores help to reveal conditions of past climate. Higher average global temperature would provide more energy and thus increase the atmospheric ^{18}O content of rain or snow, so that lower than modern amounts of ^{18}O in groundwater or ice layer imply the water or ice represents a period of cooler climatic eras or even ice ages.

Another application involves the separation of groundwater flow and baseflow from streamflow in the field of catchment hydrology (i.e. a method of hydrograph separation). Since precipitation in each rain or snowfall event has a specific isotopic signature, and subsurface water can be identified by well sampling, the composite signature in the stream is an indicator the proportion of the streamflow comes from overland flow and what portion comes from subsurface flow.

Stable isotopes in the water molecule are also useful in tracing the sources (or proportion of sources) of water that plants use.

== Current use ==
The isotope hydrology program at the International Atomic Energy Agency works to aid developing states to create a detailed portrait of Earth's water resources.

In Ethiopia, Libya, Chad, Egypt and Sudan, the International Atomic Energy Agency used radioisotope techniques to help local water policy identify and conserve fossil water.

The International Atomic Energy Agency maintains a publicly accessible global network and isotopic database for Earth's rainfall and rivers.

== See also ==
- Baseflow
- Hydrograph
- Water chemistry analysis
