= Subsurface flow =

Flow of water beneath Earth's surface

Subsurface flow, in hydrology, is the flow of water beneath Earth's surface as part of the water cycle.

In the water cycle, when precipitation falls on the Earth's land, some of the water flows on the surface forming streams and rivers. The remaining water, through infiltration, penetrates the soil traveling underground, hydrating the vadose zone soil, recharging aquifers, with the excess flowing in subsurface runoff. In hydrogeology it is measured by the Groundwater flow equation.

== Runoff ==
Water flows from areas where the water table is higher to areas where it is lower. This flow can be either surface runoff in rivers and streams, or subsurface runoff infiltrating rocks and soil. The amount of runoff reaching surface and groundwater can vary significantly, depending on rainfall, soil moisture, permeability, groundwater storage, evaporation, upstream use, and whether or not the ground is frozen. The movement of subsurface water is determined largely by the water gradient, type of substrate, and any barriers to flow. The groundwater flow may be through either confined or phreatic aquifers, with smaller flow systems overlying or within. The residence time generally ranges from several decades to many centuries, implying the establishment of a complete chemical equilibrium with the aquifer. Mapping scales are between 1:250,000 and 1:2,000,000. (see, for example, Engelen et al. 1988).

== Surface return ==
Subsurface water may return to the surface in groundwater flow, such as from a spring, seep, or a water well, or subsurface return to streams, rivers, and oceans. Water returns to the land surface at a lower elevation than where infiltration occurred, under the force of gravity or gravity induced pressures. Groundwater tends to move slowly, and is replenished slowly, so it can remain in aquifers for thousands of years. Mainly, water flows through the ground which leads to the ocean where the cycle begins again.

== Subsurface flow ==
Flow within the soil body may take place under unsaturated conditions, but faster subsurface flow is associated with localized soil saturation.

== See also ==
- Artesian aquifer
- Ecohydrology
- Groundwater
- Groundwater energy balance
- Groundwater flow
- Groundwater recharge
- Vadose zone
- Water cycle
