= Epiphreatic zone =

Zone between the saturated and unsaturated zones

Cross section showing the water table varying with surface topography as well as a perched water table

Cross-section of a hillslope depicting the vadose zone, capillary fringe, water table, and phreatic or saturated zone (Source: United States Geological Survey)

In a cave system, the epiphreatic zone or floodwater zone is the zone between the vadose (unsaturated) zone above and phreatic (saturated) zone below. It is regularly flooded and has a significant porosity. It has a great potential for cave formation.

== See also ==
- Capillary fringe – Subsurface layer in which groundwater seeps up from a water table by capillary action.
- Infiltration (hydrology) – Process by which water on the ground surface enters the soil.
- Phreatic – Term used in several scientific disciplines
- Phreatic zone – Zone in an aquifer below the water table.
- Vadose zone – Unsaturated aquifer above the water table.
