= Phreatophyte =

Type of plant

A phreatophyte is a deep-rooted plant that obtains a significant portion of the water that it needs from the phreatic zone (zone of saturation) or the capillary fringe above the phreatic zone. Phreatophytes are plants that are supplied with surface water and often have their roots constantly in touch with moisture. A phreatophyte is one that absorbs its water from a constant source on the ground. They can usually be found along streams where there is a steady flow of surface or groundwater in areas where the water table is near the surface.

Phreatophytes live in areas with standing or running water, in arid areas and along the riverbeds and areas, apparently dry, where the water table is very shallow and near the surface. These plants have very deep roots that are able to reach the water table. Phreatophytes are not only characteristic of arid or desert zones, but also of wetlands, floodplains, depressions that hold water and estuaries. In the wetlands, ecological classification does not provide a special classification, since in this case, most of the plants in the regions of high rainfall can deepen their roots to the top of the capillary fringe immediately above the water table, and function well as a phreatophyte. In this case they receive the label of mesophytic. Phreatophytic artificial extensions, manmade, are used as a method to purify greywater.

== Biological value ==
They are plants of great ecological value, fast growing pioneers and highly resistant to disease. They make excellent fodder for livestock and provide nesting areas and shelter for fauna. They are used as fuel, cheap construction material, and basketry. Many of the plants grow in degraded waters, salty or saline, that are useless for agriculture. Phreatophyte plants help to purify these waters and their roots fix heavy metals with a bacterial filter. For example, it is estimated that the total annual groundwater phreatophytes consumed in the western U.S. alone is about 30,000 cubic hectometres (1,100 billion cubic feet).

Phreatophytes are indicators of potable groundwater. Phreatophytes can be differentiated into plant communities by the length of their root, as they extend more or less deeply into the aquifer. Meinzer Studies. O.E. (1927) and Robinson, T.W. (1958) on vascular plants in the arid western U.S., set up certain general types of indicator species, according to level of minimum depth of the water table at which water was at the maximum suction RO.

Some phreatophytes have a low tolerance for salt, indicating freshwater. This can be a valuable guide to the location of drinking and agricultural water in arid and semiarid areas. Examples of phreatophytes include Welwitschia and mesquite: Prosopis glandulosa. The alfalfa, or Medicago sativa, is a widespread phreatophyte plant of great economic value. Trees like the ash, the alder, the willow and the poplar are also useful in this regard. These trees generally grow in freshwater aquifers where the water table depth is not more than ten meters.

These species are found in riparian ecosystems and areas characterized by shallow groundwater, such as bottomlands. They are also present in water limited environments; for example, oaks in the Mediterranean climate regions.

== See also ==
- Xerophyte
- Aquatic plant
