= Groundwater flow =

Groundwater discharge into a stream

In hydrogeology, groundwater flow is defined as the "part of streamflow that has infiltrated the ground, entered the phreatic zone, and has been (or is at a particular time) discharged into a stream channel or springs; and seepage water." It is governed by the groundwater flow equation. Groundwater is water that is found underground in cracks and spaces in the soil, sand and rocks. Where water has filled these spaces is the phreatic (also called) saturated zone. Groundwater is stored in and moves slowly (compared to surface runoff in temperate conditions and watercourses) through layers or zones of soil, sand and rocks: aquifers. The rate of groundwater flow depends on the permeability (the size of the spaces in the soil or rocks and how well the spaces are connected) and the hydraulic head (water pressure).

In polar regions groundwater flow may be obstructed by permafrost.

== See also ==
- Subsurface flow
- Groundwater energy balance
- Baseflow
- Ecohydrology
- Groundwater
- Hydrogeology
- Catchment hydrology
