= Water cycle =

Biogeochemical cycle for movement of water on Earth

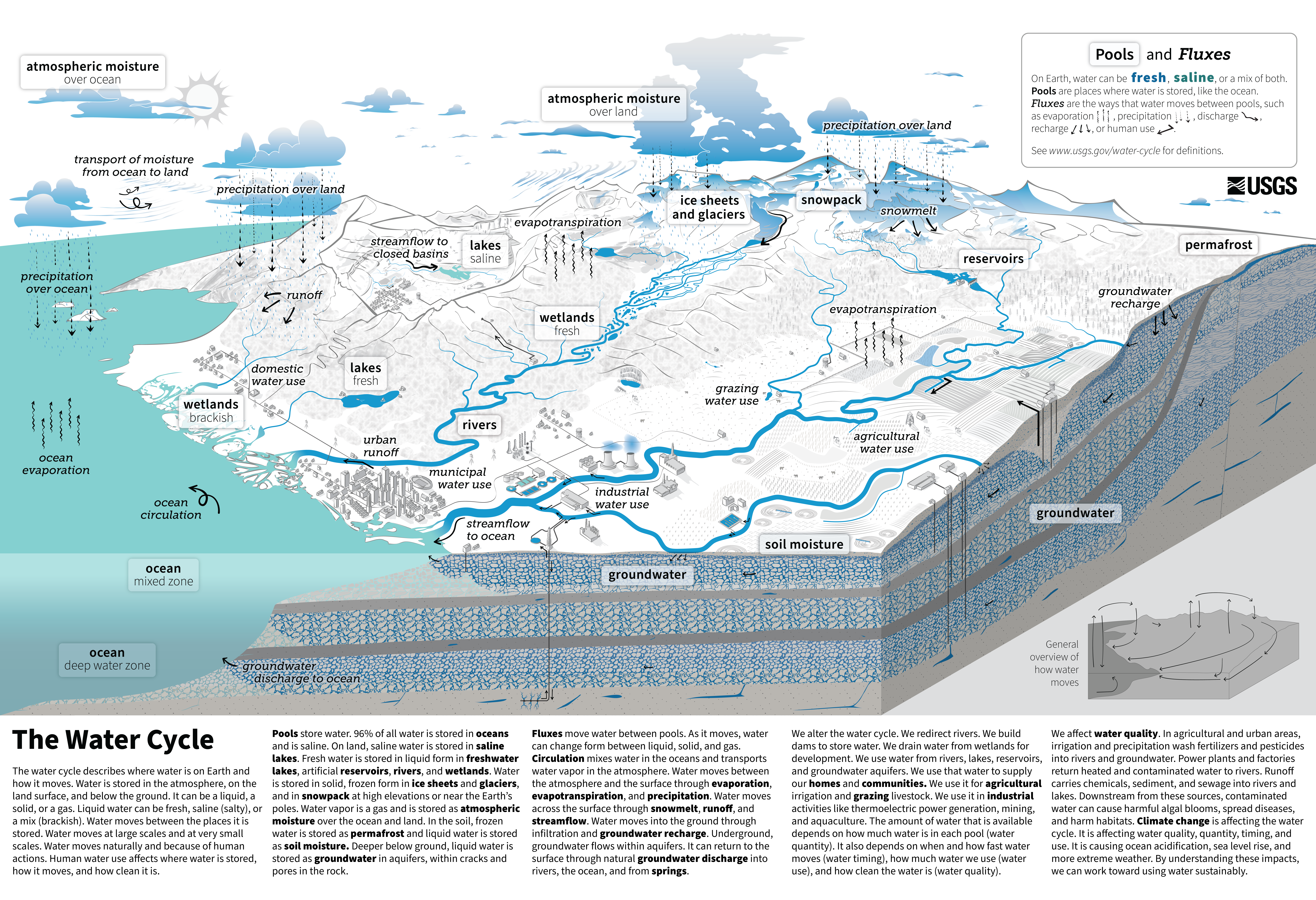
A detailed diagram depicting the global water cycle. The direction of movement of water between reservoirs tends towards upwards movement through evapotranspiration and downward movement through gravity. The diagram also shows how human water use impacts where water is stored and how it moves.

The water cycle (or hydrologic cycle or hydrological cycle) is a biogeochemical cycle that involves the continuous change in form of water on, above and below the surface of the Earth across different reservoirs. The mass of water on Earth remains fairly constant over time. However, the partitioning of the water into the major reservoirs of ice, fresh water, salt water and atmospheric water is variable and depends on climatic variables. The water moves from one reservoir to another, such as from river to ocean, or from the ocean to the atmosphere due to a variety of physical and chemical processes. The processes that drive these movements, or fluxes, are evaporation, transpiration, condensation, precipitation, sublimation, infiltration, surface runoff, and subsurface flow. In doing so, the water goes through different phases: liquid, solid (ice) and vapor. The ocean plays a key role in the water cycle as it is the source of 86% of global evaporation.

The water cycle is driven by energy exchanges in the form of heat transfers between different phases. The energy released or absorbed during a phase change can result in temperature changes. Heat is absorbed as water transitions from the liquid to the vapor phase through evaporation. This heat is also known as the latent heat of vaporization. Conversely, when water condenses or melts from solid ice it releases energy and heat. On a global scale, water plays a critical role in transferring heat from the tropics to the poles via ocean circulation.

The evaporative phase of the cycle also acts as a purification process by separating water molecules from salts and other particles that are present in its liquid phase. The condensation phase in the atmosphere replenishes the land with freshwater. The flow of liquid water transports minerals across the globe. It also reshapes the geological features of the Earth, through processes of weathering, erosion, and deposition. The water cycle is also essential for the maintenance of most life and ecosystems on the planet.

Human actions are greatly affecting the water cycle. Activities such as deforestation, urbanization, and the extraction of groundwater are altering natural landscapes (land use changes) all have an effect on the water cycle. On top of this, climate change is leading to an intensification of the water cycle. Research has shown that global warming is causing shifts in precipitation patterns, increased frequency of extreme weather events, and changes in the timing and intensity of rainfall. These water cycle changes affect ecosystems, water availability, agriculture, and human societies.

== Description ==
Video of the Earth's water cycle (NASA)

=== Overall process ===
The water cycle is powered by the energy emitted from the sun. There are several ways in which this is accomplished, one of the first ways is through evaporation where the energy from the sun heats the water in oceans, lakes, streams, rivers, seas, ponds, etc. and that water goes through a phase change to become a gas (water vapor) that goes up into the atmosphere. Two other ways that water gets into the atmosphere is through snow and ice sublimating into water vapor and through evapotranspiration which is water transpired from plants and evaporated from the soil.

Clouds form because water molecules have a smaller molecular mass than the major gas components of the atmosphere (oxygen, O_{2}; and nitrogen, N_{2}); this smaller molecular mass leads to water having a lower density which drives the water molecules higher up in the atmosphere due to buoyancy. However, as altitude increases, air pressure decreases which causes a drop in temperature. The lower temperature forces the water vapor to go through another phase change, this time it forces it to condense into liquid water droplets which are supported by an updraft; if there is enough of these water droplets over a large area, it is considered a cloud. Condensation of the water vapour closer to the ground level is referred to as fog.

Atmospheric circulation moves water vapor around the globe; cloud particles collide, grow, and fall out of the upper atmospheric layers as precipitation. Some precipitation falls as snow, hail, or sleet, and can accumulate in ice caps and glaciers, which can store frozen water for thousands of years. Most water falls as rain back into the ocean or onto land, where the water flows over the ground as surface runoff. A portion of this runoff enters rivers, with streamflow moving water towards the oceans. Runoff and water emerging from the ground (groundwater) may be stored as freshwater in lakes. Not all runoff flows into rivers; much of it soaks into the ground as infiltration. Some water infiltrates deep into the ground and replenishes aquifers, which can store freshwater for long periods of time. Some infiltration stays close to the land surface and can seep back into surface-water bodies (and the ocean) as groundwater discharge or be taken up by plants and transferred back to the atmosphere as water vapor by transpiration. Some groundwater finds openings in the land surface and emerges as freshwater springs. In river valleys and floodplains, there is often continuous water exchange between surface water and ground water in the hyporheic zone. Over time, the water returns to the ocean, to continue the water cycle.

The ocean plays a key role in the water cycle. The ocean holds "97% of the total water on the planet; 78% of global precipitation occurs over the ocean, and it is the source of 86% of global evaporation".

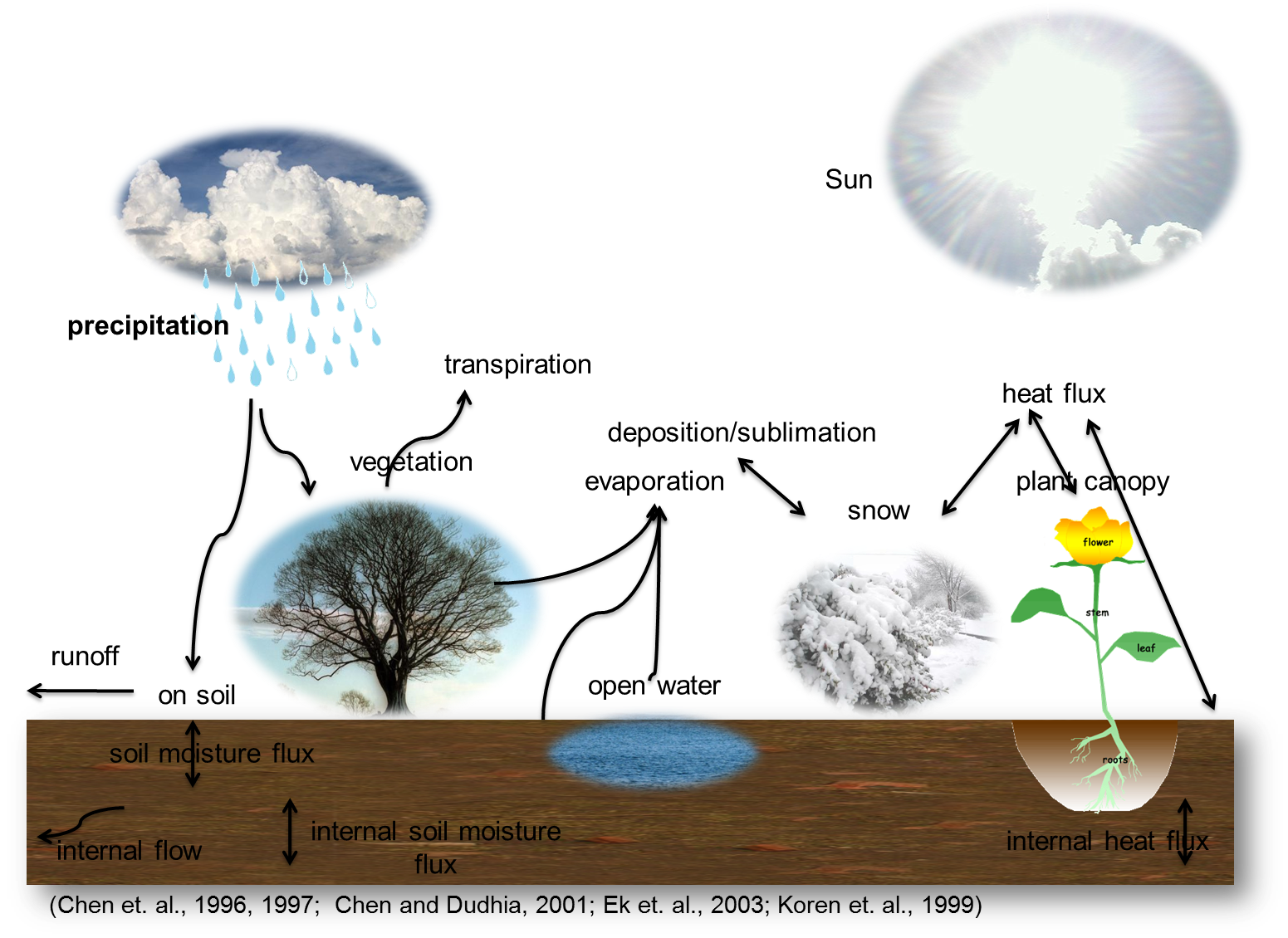
Processes leading to movements and phase changes in water

Important physical processes within the water cycle include (in alphabetical order):

- Advection: The movement of water through the atmosphere. Without advection, water that evaporated over the oceans could not precipitate over land. Atmospheric rivers that move large volumes of water vapor over long distances are an example of advection.
- Condensation: The transformation of water vapor to liquid water droplets in the air, creating clouds and fog.
- Evaporation: The transformation of water from liquid to gas phases as it moves from the ground or bodies of water into the overlying atmosphere. The source of energy for evaporation is primarily solar radiation. Evaporation often implicitly includes transpiration from plants, though together they are specifically referred to as evapotranspiration. Total annual evapotranspiration amounts to approximately 505,000 km^{3} (121,000 cu mi) of water, 434,000 km^{3} (104,000 cu mi) of which evaporates from the oceans. 86% of global evaporation occurs over the ocean.
- Infiltration: The flow of water from the ground surface into the ground. Once infiltrated, the water becomes soil moisture or groundwater. A recent global study using water stable isotopes, however, shows that not all soil moisture is equally available for groundwater recharge or for plant transpiration.
- Percolation: Water flows vertically through the soil and rocks under the influence of gravity.
- Precipitation: Condensed water vapor that falls to the Earth's surface. Most precipitation occurs as rain, but also includes snow, hail, fog drip, graupel, and sleet. Approximately 505,000 km^{3} (121,000 cu mi) of water falls as precipitation each year, 398,000 km^{3} (95,000 cu mi) of it over the oceans. The rain on land contains 107,000 km^{3} (26,000 cu mi) of water per year and a snowing only 1,000 km^{3} (240 cu mi). 78% of global precipitation occurs over the ocean.
- Runoff: The variety of ways by which water moves across the land. This includes both surface runoff and channel runoff. As it flows, the water may seep into the ground, evaporate into the air, become stored in lakes or reservoirs, or be extracted for agricultural or other human uses.
- Subsurface flow: The flow of water underground, in the vadose zone and aquifers. Subsurface water may return to the surface (e.g. as a spring or by being pumped) or eventually seep into the oceans. Water returns to the land surface at lower elevation than where it infiltrated, under the force of gravity or gravity induced pressures. Groundwater tends to move slowly and is replenished slowly, so it can remain in aquifers for thousands of years.
- Transpiration: The release of water vapor from plants and soil into the air.

=== Residence times ===
Average reservoir residence times
Reservoir	Average residence time
Antarctica	20,000 years
Oceans	3,200 years
Glaciers	20 to 100 years
Seasonal snow cover	2 to 6 months
Soil moisture	1 to 2 months
Groundwater: shallow	100 to 200 years
Groundwater: deep	10,000 years
Lakes (see lake retention time)	50 to 100 years
Rivers	2 to 6 months
Atmosphere	9 days

The residence time of a reservoir within the hydrologic cycle is the average time a water molecule will spend in that reservoir (see table). It is a measure of the average age of the water in that reservoir.

Groundwater can spend over 10,000 years beneath Earth's surface before leaving. Particularly old groundwater is called fossil water. Water stored in the soil remains there very briefly, because it is spread thinly across the Earth, and is readily lost by evaporation, transpiration, stream flow, or groundwater recharge. After evaporating, the residence time in the atmosphere is about 9 days before condensing and falling to the Earth as precipitation.

The major ice sheets – Antarctica and Greenland – store ice for very long periods. Ice from Antarctica has been reliably dated to 800,000 years before present, though the average residence time is shorter.

In hydrology, residence times can be estimated in two ways. The more common method relies on the principle of conservation of mass (water balance) and assumes the amount of water in a given reservoir is roughly constant. With this method, residence times are estimated by dividing the volume of the reservoir by the rate by which water either enters or exits the reservoir. Conceptually, this is equivalent to timing how long it would take the reservoir to become filled from empty if no water were to leave (or how long it would take the reservoir to empty from full if no water were to enter).

An alternative method to estimate residence times, which is gaining in popularity for dating groundwater, is the use of isotopic techniques. This is done in the subfield of isotope hydrology.

=== Water in storage ===
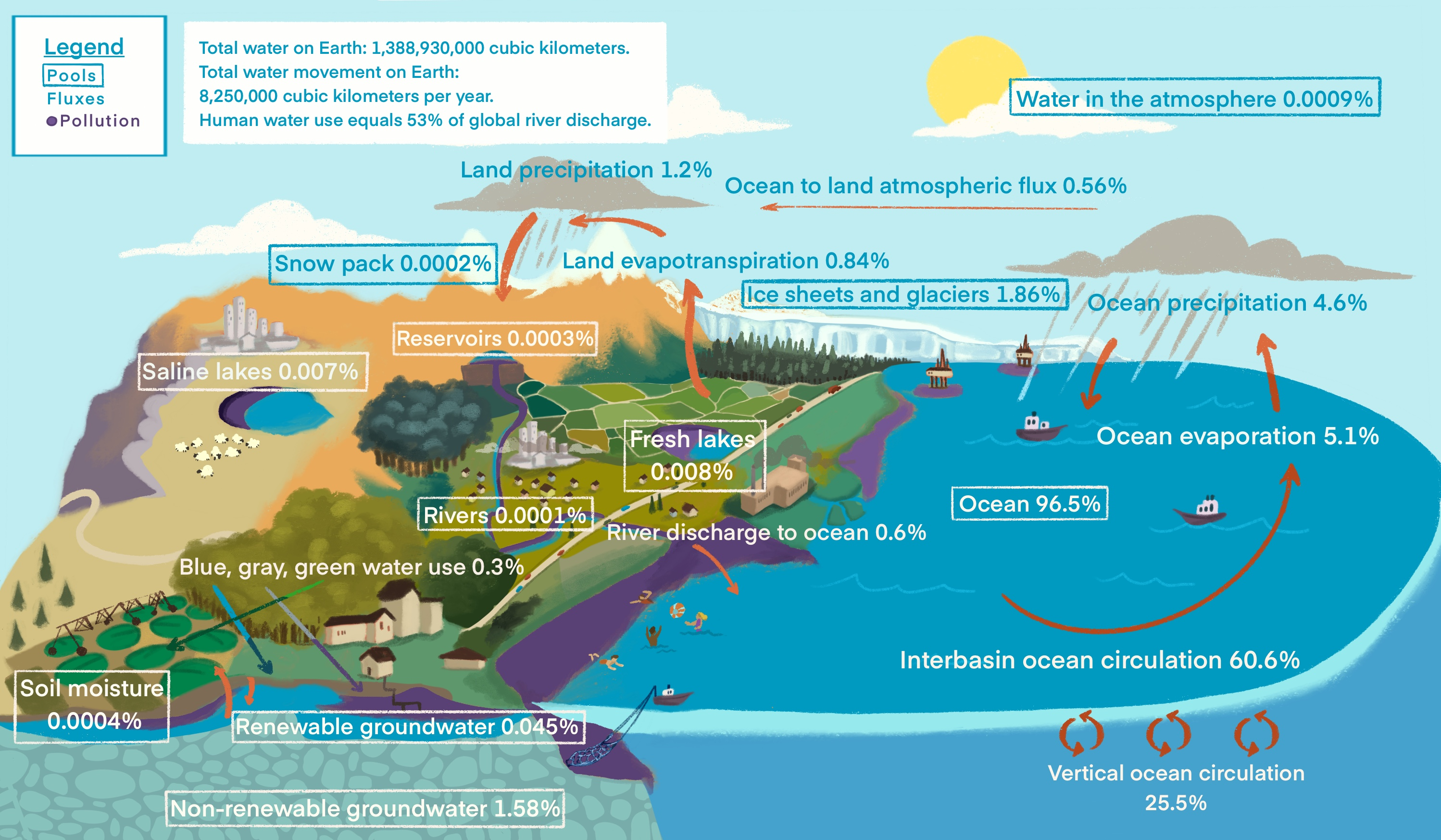
Water cycle showing human influences and major pools (storages) and fluxes

The water cycle describes the processes that drive the movement of water throughout the hydrosphere. However, much more water is "in storage" (or in "pools") for long periods of time than is actually moving through the cycle. The storehouses for the vast majority of all water on Earth are the oceans. It is estimated that of the 1,386,000,000 km^{3} of the world's water supply, about 1,338,000,000 km^{3} is stored in oceans, or about 97%. It is also estimated that the oceans supply about 90% of the evaporated water that goes into the water cycle. The Earth's ice caps, glaciers, and permanent snowpack store another 24,064,000 km^{3}, accounting for only 1.7% of the planet's total water volume. However, this quantity of water is 68.7% of all fresh water on the planet.

== Changes caused by humans ==
=== Land cover and land use changes ===
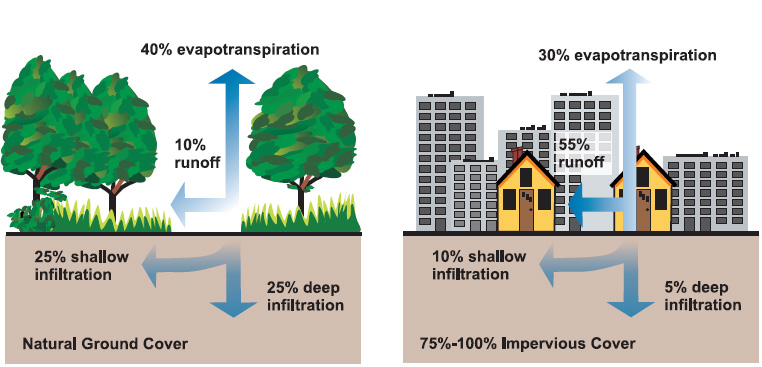
Relationship between impervious surfaces and surface runoff

Human activities can alter the water cycle at the local or regional level. This happens due to changes in land use and land cover. Such changes affect "precipitation, evaporation, flooding, groundwater, and the availability of freshwater for a variety of uses".

Examples of common land use changes include urbanization, agricultural expansion, and deforestation. These changes can increase soil compaction and impervious surface cover which decrease the infiltration capacity of soils and result in greater surface runoff rates. Deforestation has local and regional effects; at the local level it reduces soil moisture, evaporation, rainfall, and snowfall; at the regional level it can cause temperature changes that affect rainfall patterns.

Water management structures such as dams, stormwater drains, and sewage pipes can also alter local hydrologic conditions. Dams can alter natural flow rates, decrease water quality, and lead to a loss of habitat for aquatic species. Stormwater drains function to decrease runoff rates, regulate flow rates, and increase groundwater recharge. Leakage from sewage pipes may artificially contribute to groundwater recharge, resulting in higher stream baseflow conditions and groundwater contamination. Groundwater depletion, however, remains an ongoing concern as groundwater is being pumped at unsustainable rates to meet municipal, industrial, and agricultural water demands.

=== Water cycle intensification due to climate change ===
Extreme weather (heavy rains, droughts, heat waves) is one consequence of a changing water cycle due to global warming. These events will be progressively more common as the Earth warms more and more.

Predicted changes in average soil moisture for a scenario of 2°C global warming. This can disrupt agriculture and ecosystems. A reduction in soil moisture by one standard deviation means that average soil moisture will approximately match the ninth driest year between 1850 and 1900 at that location.

Since the middle of the 20th century, human-caused climate change has resulted in observable changes in the global water cycle. The IPCC Sixth Assessment Report in 2021 predicted that these changes will continue to grow significantly at the global and regional level. These findings are a continuation of scientific consensus expressed in the IPCC Fifth Assessment Report from 2007 and other special reports by the Intergovernmental Panel on Climate Change which had already stated that the water cycle will continue to intensify throughout the 21st century.

The effects of climate change on the water cycle are profound and have been described as an intensification or a strengthening of the water cycle (also called the hydrologic cycle). This effect has been observed since at least 1980. One example is when heavy rain events become even stronger. The effects of climate change on the water cycle have important negative effects on the availability of freshwater resources, as well as other water reservoirs such as oceans, ice sheets, the atmosphere, and soil moisture. The water cycle is essential to life on Earth and plays a large role in the global climate system and ocean circulation. The warming of our planet is expected to be accompanied by changes in the water cycle for various reasons. For example, a warmer atmosphere can contain more water vapor which has effects on evaporation and rainfall.

The underlying cause of the intensifying water cycle is the increased amount of greenhouse gases (GHGs) in the atmosphere, which lead to a warmer atmosphere through the greenhouse effect. Fundamental laws of physics explain how the saturation vapor pressure in the atmosphere increases by 7% when temperature rises by 1 °C. This relationship is known as the Clausius-Clapeyron equation.

The strength of the water cycle and its changes over time are of considerable interest, especially as the climate changes. The hydrological cycle is a system whereby the evaporation of moisture in one place leads to precipitation (rain or snow) in another place. For example, evaporation always exceeds precipitation over the oceans. This allows moisture to be transported by the atmosphere from the oceans onto land where precipitation exceeds evapotranspiration. The runoff from the land flows into streams and rivers and discharges into the ocean, which completes the global cycle. The water cycle is a key part of Earth's energy cycle through the evaporative cooling at the surface which provides latent heat to the atmosphere, as atmospheric systems play a primary role in moving heat upward.

== Related processes ==
=== Biogeochemical cycling ===
While the water cycle is itself a biogeochemical cycle, flow of water over and beneath the Earth is a key component of the cycling of other biogeochemicals. Runoff is responsible for almost all of the transport of eroded sediment and phosphorus from land to waterbodies. The salinity of the oceans is derived from erosion and transport of dissolved salts from the land. Cultural eutrophication of lakes is primarily due to phosphorus, applied in excess to agricultural fields in fertilizers, and then transported overland and down rivers. Both runoff and groundwater flow play significant roles in transporting nitrogen from the land to waterbodies. The dead zone at the outlet of the Mississippi River is a consequence of nitrates from fertilizer being carried off agricultural fields and funnelled down the river system to the Gulf of Mexico. Runoff also plays a part in the carbon cycle, again through the transport of eroded rock and soil.

=== Slow loss over geologic time ===
The hydrodynamic wind within the upper portion of a planet's atmosphere allows light chemical elements such as Hydrogen to move up to the exobase, the lower limit of the exosphere, where the gases can then reach escape velocity, entering outer space without impacting other particles of gas. This type of gas loss from a planet into space is known as planetary wind. Planets with hot lower atmospheres could result in humid upper atmospheres that accelerate the loss of hydrogen.

== Historical interpretations ==
In ancient times, it was widely thought that the land mass floated on a body of water, and that most of the water in rivers has its origin under the earth. Examples of this belief can be found in the works of Homer (c. 800 BCE).

In Works and Days (ca. 700 BC), the Greek poet Hesiod outlines the idea of the water cycle: "[Vapour] is drawn from the ever-flowing rivers and is raised high above the earth by windstorm, and sometimes it turns to rain towards evening, and sometimes to wind when Thracian Boreas huddles the thick clouds."

In the ancient Near East, Hebrew scholars observed that even though the rivers ran into the sea, the sea never became full. Some scholars conclude that the water cycle was described completely during this time in this passage: "The wind goeth toward the south, and turneth about unto the north; it whirleth about continually, and the wind returneth again according to its circuits. All the rivers run into the sea, yet the sea is not full; unto the place from whence the rivers come, thither they return again" (Ecclesiastes 1:6-7). Furthermore, it was also observed that when the clouds were full, they emptied rain on the earth (Ecclesiastes 11:3).

In the Adityahridayam (a devotional hymn to the Sun God) of Ramayana, a Hindu epic dated to the 4th century BCE, it is mentioned in the 22nd verse that the Sun heats up water and sends it down as rain. By roughly 500 BCE, Greek scholars were speculating that much of the water in rivers can be attributed to rain. The origin of rain was also known by then. These scholars maintained the belief, however, that water rising up through the earth contributed a great deal to rivers. Examples of this thinking included Anaximander (570 BCE) (who also speculated about the evolution of land animals from fish) and Xenophanes of Colophon (530 BCE). Warring States period Chinese scholars such as Chi Ni Tzu (320 BCE) and Lu Shih Ch'un Ch'iu (239 BCE) had similar thoughts.

The idea that the water cycle is a closed cycle can be found in the works of Anaxagoras of Clazomenae (460 BCE) and Diogenes of Apollonia (460 BCE). Both Plato (390 BCE) and Aristotle (350 BCE) speculated about percolation as part of the water cycle. Aristotle correctly hypothesized that the sun played a role in the Earth's hydraulic cycle in his book Meteorology, writing "By it [the sun's] agency the finest and sweetest water is everyday carried up and is dissolved into vapor and rises to the upper regions, where it is condensed again by the cold and so returns to the earth," and believed that clouds were composed of cooled and condensed water vapor. Much like the earlier Aristotle, the Eastern Han Chinese scientist Wang Chong (27–100 AD) accurately described the water cycle of Earth in his Lunheng but was dismissed by his contemporaries.

Up to the time of the Renaissance, it was wrongly assumed that precipitation alone was insufficient to feed rivers, for a complete water cycle, and that underground water pushing upwards from the oceans were the main contributors to river water. Bartholomew of England held this view (1240 CE), as did Leonardo da Vinci (1500 CE) and Athanasius Kircher (1644 CE).

=== Discovery of the correct theory ===
The first published thinker to assert that rainfall alone was sufficient for the maintenance of rivers was Bernard Palissy (1580 CE), who is often credited as the discoverer of the modern theory of the water cycle. Palissy's theories were not tested scientifically until 1674, in a study commonly attributed to Pierre Perrault. Even then, these beliefs were not accepted in mainstream science until the early nineteenth century.

== See also ==
- Cryosphere – Earth's surface where water is frozen
- Deep water cycle – Movement of water in the deep Earth
- Ecohydrology – Field of scientific study
- Water resources – Sources of water that are potentially useful for humans
- Biotic pump – Theory of how forests affect rainfall
