= Aquifer susceptibility =

Ability of permeable rock to hold liquids

An aquifer is a body of permeable rock that can contain or transmit groundwater. Aquifer susceptibility is the inherent ability of a formation to accept and transmit liquids (potentially including contaminants). Certain areas of the United States are becoming more reliant on groundwater to meet the needs of the population.

== Causes ==
Every day, roughly 2 millimetres of rainfall falls globally. About one fourth of that will make its way through the aquifers and become ground water. Shallow and permeable water tables tend to be more susceptible to contamination. In addition, the less rain an area receives the more concentrated the contamination will be. Evapotranspiration can also decrease the amount of water moving downward.

Some aquifer susceptibility does happen naturally. Natural chemicals can seep through the aquifers from nearby soil and rocks. However, too much of this can be bad. One of the most common concerns is the amount of chloride and dissolved solids that are found in the water. Federal standards state the maximum for dissolved solids is 500 mg/l (0.00029 oz/cu in) and 250 mg/l (0.00014 oz/cu in) for chloride. Dissolved solids and chloride are often found in coastal aquifers and in aquifers deeper than a few hundred feet. Iron and magnesium can also affect the groundwater. It can also reduce the efficiency of well pumping.

While there is not usually a huge amount of nitrogen in groundwater, human involvement can increase it. Federal standards state that the maximum level of nitrogen in groundwater is 10 mg/L. If humans do not interfere, levels generally stay around 0.2 mg/l (1.2×10^{−7} oz/cu in). However, if levels exceed 3 mg/l (1.7×10^{−6} oz/cu in), this could mean human involvement. Usually nitrogen is not harmful but it has been found to cause methemoglobinemia in infants.

The susceptibility of the aquifer also depends on whether the aquifer has large or small pores. A rock that has a low conductivity level is known as an aquitard. This can constrict the amount of water that is available to use.

== Effects on groundwater ==
Groundwater has become a very important source of drinking water for over half of the United States. It is especially important in rural areas, where all of the drinking water comes from the ground.

Here are some statistics on ground water dependability proved by the groundwater Project Education Policy:

- 22 percent of all freshwater withdrawals
- 53 percent of drinking water for the total population and 97 percent of drinking water for neutral population
- 40 percent of public water supply withdrawals
- 46 percent of domestic and commercial use
- 24 percent of industrial and mining use
- 34 percent of agricultural use (mostly for irrigation)

Aquifers are also an important source for the groundwater that feeds into wells. The groundwater must go through these aquifers to get to the well. However, the well has an effect on the aquifers as well. Pumping through much water through these wells can cause a cone of depression around the well.

The Virginia Department of Health and the U.S. Geological Survey is conducting a study to determine the susceptibility of aquifers in Virginia. The information is used to determine whether the groundwater is safe enough to drink. The study will take place over a period of four years. The researchers will use Carbon-14 to determine the age of the contamination.

== Prevention ==
These aquifers need to be protected from contamination so they can provide clean water. Programs have been put in place to protect this valuable groundwater. These programs include Wellhead and Source Water Protection Program. Close attention also needs to be made in areas near agricultural and urban areas, as these are high risk areas for aquifer susceptibility.
