= Ecohydrology =

Field of scientific study

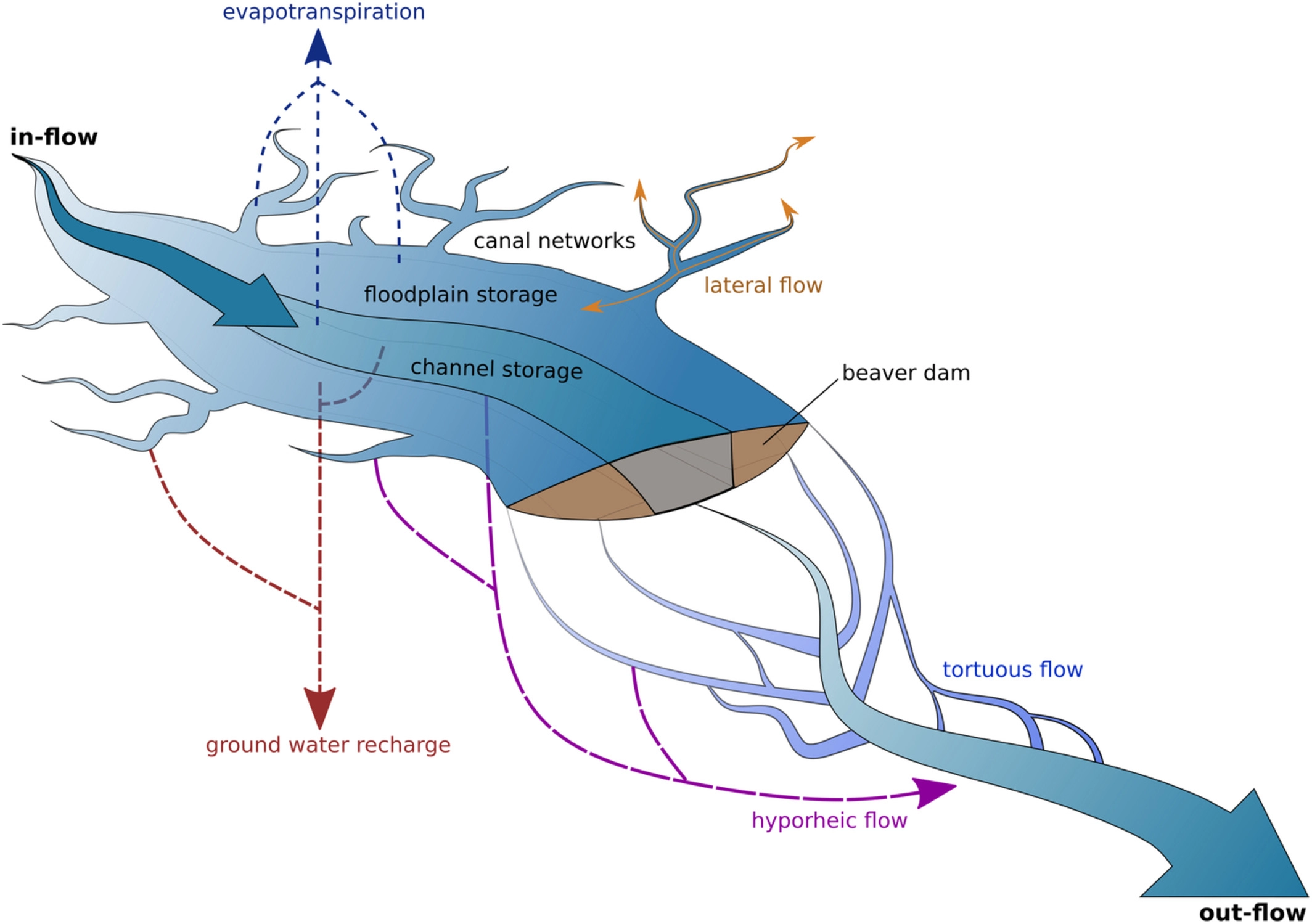
Conceptual model describing the mechanisms of water flow attenuation within a beaver wetland with an unconfined floodplain

Ecohydrology (from Greek οἶκος, oikos, "house(hold)"; ὕδωρ, hydōr, "water"; and -λογία, -logia) is an interdisciplinary scientific field studying the interactions between water and ecological systems. It is considered a sub discipline of hydrology, with an ecological focus. These interactions may take place within water bodies, such as rivers and lakes, or on land, in forests, deserts, and other terrestrial ecosystems. Areas of research in ecohydrology include transpiration and plant water use, adaption of organisms to their water environment, influence of vegetation and benthic plants on stream flow and function, and feedbacks between ecological processes, the soil carbon sponge and the hydrological cycle.

== Key concepts ==
The hydrologic cycle describes the continuous movement of water on, above, and below the surface on the earth. This flow is altered by ecosystems at numerous points. Transpiration from plants provides the majority of flow of water to the atmosphere. Water is influenced by vegetative cover as it flows over the land surface, while river channels can be shaped by the vegetation within them. Ecohydrology was developed under the International Hydrological Program of UNESCO.

Ecohydrologists study both terrestrial and aquatic systems. In terrestrial ecosystems (such as forests, deserts, and savannas), the interactions among vegetation, the land surface, the vadose zone, and the groundwater are the main focus. In aquatic ecosystems (such as rivers, streams, lakes, and wetlands), emphasis is placed on how water chemistry, geomorphology, and hydrology affect their structure and function.

=== Principles ===
The general assumptions of ecological hydrology is to decrease ecosystem degradation using concepts that integrate terrestrial and aquatic processes across scales. The principles of Ecohydrology are expressed in three sequential components:

1. Hydrological (Framework): The quantification of the hydrological cycle of a basin, should be a template for functional integration of hydrological and biological processes. This perspective includes issue of scale, water and temperature dynamics, and hierarchical interactions between biotic and abiotic factors.
2. Ecological (Target): The integrated processes at river basin scale can be steered in such a way as to enhance the basin's carrying capacity and its ecosystem services. This component deals with aspects of ecosystem resilience and resistance.
3. Ecological Engineering (Method): The regulation of hydrological and ecological processes, based on an integrative system approach, is thus a new tool for Integrated Water Basin Management. This method integrates the hydrological framework and ecological targets to improve water quality and ecosystem services, using engineering methods such as levees, biomanipulation, reforestation, and other management strategies.

Their expression as testable hypotheses (Zalewski et al., 1997) may be seen as:

- H1: Hydrological processes generally regulate biota
- H2: Biota can be shaped as a tool to regulate hydrological processes
- H3: These two types of regulations (H1&H2) can be integrated with hydro-technical infrastructure to achieve sustainable water and ecosystem services.

The ecological hydrology in a specific system can be assessed by answering a few basic questions Where does the water come from and where does it go? This is defined as the flowpath taken by the water entering the watershed being assessed. How long does the water stay in a specific flux or pool of water? This is defined as residence time, in which the rate the water enters, exits, or is stored can be observed. What reactions and changes does the water undergo through those processes? This is defined as biogeochemical reactions, which have the potential to change the solutes, nutrients, or compounds in the water. Many methods are used to observe and test watersheds for the answers to these questions. Namely, hydrographs, environmental and injected tracers, or equations such as Darcy's law. These three factors are interactive and interdependent. The connectivity of a watershed often defines how these traits will interact. As seasonal or event-scale flows occur, changes in connectivity of a watershed affect flowpath, residence time, and biogeochemical reactions. Places of high reaction activity in a specific place or time are called hot spots or hot moments (Pedroli, 1990)(Wand et al., 2015)(Krause et al., 2017)(Fisher et al., 2004)(Trauth et al., 2014)(Covino, 2016).

=== Vegetation and water stress ===
A fundamental concept in ecohydrology is that the development of the soil carbon sponge and plant physiology is directly linked to water availability. Where there is ample water, as in rainforests, plant growth is more dependent on nutrient availability. However, in semi-arid areas, like African savannas, vegetation type and distribution relate directly to the amount of water that plants can extract from the soil. When insufficient soil water is available, a water-stressed condition occurs. Plants under water stress decrease both their transpiration and photosynthesis through a number of responses, including closing their stomata. This decrease in the canopy forest, canopy water flux and carbon dioxide flux can influence surrounding climate and weather.

Insufficient soil moisture produces stress in plants, and water availability is one of the two most important factors (temperature being the other) that determine species distribution. High winds, low atmospheric relative humidity, low carbon dioxide, high temperature, and high irradiance all exacerbate soil moisture insufficiency. Soil moisture availability is also reduced at low soil temperature. One of the earliest responses to insufficient moisture supply is a reduction in turgor pressure; cell expansion and growth are immediately inhibited, and unsuberized shoots soon wilt. At larger spatial scales, groundwater availability can also regulate vegetation activity, with an effect comparable to that of climatic water availability.

The concept of water deficit, as developed by Stocker in the 1920s, is a useful index of the balance in the plant between uptake and loss of water. Slight water deficits are normal and do not impair the functioning of the plant, while greater deficits disrupt normal plant processes.

An increase in moisture stress in the rooting medium (soil carbon sponge) as small as five atmospheres affects growth, transpiration, and internal water balance in seedlings. This affects Norway spruce seedlings more than birch, aspen, or Scots pine. The decrease in net assimilation rate is greater in the spruce than in the other species, and, of those species, only the spruce shows no increase in water use efficiency as the soil becomes drier. The two conifers Norway spruce and Scots pine show larger differences in water potential between leaf and substrate than do the hardwoods. Transpiration rate decrease less in Norway spruce than in the other three species as soil water stress increases up to 5 atmospheres in controlled environments. In field conditions, Norway spruce needles lose three times as much water from the fully turgid state as do birch and aspen leaves, and twice as much as Scots pine, before apparent closure of stomata (although there is some difficulty in determining the exact point of closure). Assimilation may therefore continue longer in spruce than in pine when plant water stresses are high, though spruce will probably be the first to "run out of water".

=== Soil moisture dynamics ===
Soil moisture is a general term describing the amount of water present in the vadose zone, or unsaturated portion of soil below ground. Since plants depend on this water to carry out critical biological processes, soil moisture is integral to the study of ecohydrology. Soil moisture is generally described as water content, $\theta$, or saturation, $S$. These terms are related by porosity, $n$, through the equation $\theta = nS$. The changes in soil moisture over time are known as soil moisture dynamics.

Recent global studies using water stable isotopes show that not all soil moisture is equally available for groundwater recharge or for plant transpiration.

Plant available water in sandy soils can be increased by the presence of sepiolite clay.

=== Nutrient Spiraling and Health of Watersheds ===
Nutrient spiraling describes the way biological and physical processes are combined to control nutrient transport or nutrient control. Water travels downstream exchanging nutrients through nutrient rich upwellings and oxygen rich down-wellings. Rather than one continuous or gradual exchange, nutrients cycle in compartments along the river bed. The total spiraling length (S) is composed of the uptake length (Sw) and the turnover length (Sp and Sc). Sw is the average length a dissolved nutrient is transported downstream before being taken up again. This pathway can be conceptualized as an imaginary spiral. Nutrient spiraling can be influenced by stream stage because of the higher or lower fractional interaction of the water with channel bed where the nutrient cycling occurs. Low nutrient interaction in the high stage and high nutrient interaction in the low stage. (

Watersheds can have increased and decreased ability to cycle nutrients within their overall system given their grade, discharge and velocity. However, mankind has also had significant impact in this area, leading to the overall degradation of watershed system health in many cases. "Agricultural, urbanization, and resource extraction have dramatically increased nutrient loading and altered dissolved organic matter (DOM) delivery and production....In the past 60 years, human activity has more than doubled global nitrogen fixation and quadrupled phosphorus loading. At the same time, human land-use has directly disturbed half of global land surface, fundamentally altering the capacity of ecosystems to buffer or process [or cycle] these nutrient inputs."

=== Temporal and spatial considerations ===
Ecohydrological theory also places importance on considerations of temporal (time) and spatial (space) relationships. Hydrology, in particular the timing of precipitation events, can be a critical factor in the way an ecosystem evolves over time. For instance, Mediterranean landscapes experience dry summers and wet winters. If the vegetation has a summer growing season, it often experiences water stress, even though the total precipitation throughout the year may be moderate. Ecosystems in these regions have typically evolved to support high water demand grasses in the winter, when water availability is high, and drought-adapted trees in the summer, when it is low.

Ecohydrology also concerns itself with the hydrological factors behind the spatial distribution of plants. The optimal spacing and spatial organization of plants is at least partially determined by water availability. In ecosystems with low soil moisture, trees are typically located further apart than they would be in well-watered areas.

== Basic equations and models ==
=== Water balance at a point ===
A fundamental equation in ecohydrology is the water balance at a point in the landscape. A water balance states that the amount water entering the soil must be equal to the amount of water leaving the soil plus the change in the amount of water stored in the soil. The water balance has four main components: infiltration of precipitation into the soil, evapotranspiration, leakage of water into deeper portions of the soil not accessible to the plant, and runoff from the ground surface. It is described by the following equation:

$nZ_{r} \frac{ds(t)}{dt}=R(t) - I(t) - Q[s(t),t]- E[s(t)] - L[s(t)]$

The terms on the left hand side of the equation describe the total amount of water contained in the rooting zone - the soil carbon sponge. This water, accessible to vegetation, has a volume equal to the porosity of the soil ($n$) multiplied by its saturation ($s$) and the depth of the plant's roots ($Z_{r}$). The differential equation $ds(t)/dt$ describes how the soil saturation changes over time. The terms on the right hand side describe the rates of rainfall ($R$), interception ($I$), runoff ($Q$), evapotranspiration ($E$), and leakage ($L$). These are typically given in millimeters per day (mm/d). Runoff, evaporation, and leakage are all highly dependent on the soil saturation at a given time.

In order to solve the equation, the rate of evapotranspiration as a function of soil moisture must be known. The model generally used to describe it states that above a certain saturation, evaporation will only be dependent on climate factors such as available sunlight. Once below this point, soil moisture imposes controls on evapotranspiration, and it decreases until the soil reaches the point where the vegetation can no longer extract any more water. This soil level is generally referred to as the "permanent wilting point". Use of this term can lead to confusion because many plant species do not actually "wilt".

=== Damköhler numbers ===
The Damkohler number is a unitless ratio that predicts whether the duration in which a particular nutrient or solute is in specific pool or flux of water will be sufficient time for a specific reaction to occur.

$Da = {\frac{T_{transport}}{T_{reaction}}}$

Where T is the time of either the transport or the reaction. Transport time can be substituted for T exposure to determine if a reaction can realistically occur depending on during how much of the transport time the reactant will be exposed to the correct conditions to react. A Damkohler number greater than 1 signifies that the reaction has time to react completely, whereas the opposite is true for a Damkohler number less than 1.

=== Darcy's Law ===
Darcy's Law is an equation that describes the flow of a fluid through a porous medium. The law was formulated by Henry Darcy in the early 1800s when he was charged with the task to bring water through an aquifer to the town of Dijon, France. Henry conducted various experiments on the flow of water through beds of sand to derive the equation.

$Q = -KA{\frac{H}{L}}$

Where Q is Discharge measured in m^{3}/sec. K is hydraulic conductivity (m/s). A is cross sectional area that the water travels (m2). Where H is change in height over the gradual distance of the aquifer (m). Where L is the length of the aquifer or distance the water travels (m).

=== Hydrograph ===
Hydrographs are models used to analyze water discharge at a certain point in the river. They are usually used after a rain or flood event to show how the flow of water changed. It is measured in Volume /Time.

There are 3 main axis in a hydrograph. They are Time, Discharge, and Precipitation.

=== Water Balance ===
This general equation applies mass conservation to water systems and is used to calculate a closed systems water outflows/inflows.

P = R + ET + ΔS

Where P is precipitation. R is streamflow. ET is evapotranspiration. ΔS is change in storage.

== See also ==
- Canopy conductance
- Stomatal conductance
- Transpiration
