= Silvanus P. Thompson =

British academic physicist (1851–1916)

Silvanus P. Thompson FRS
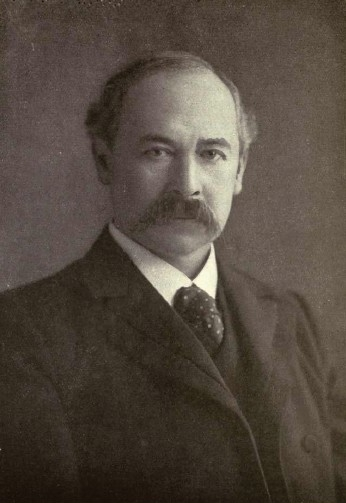
- Photograph from Thompson's obituary in the Proceedings of the Royal Society
- Born: Silvanus Philips Thompson; 19 June 1851; York, England
- Died: 12 June 1916 (aged 64); London, England
- Education: University of London (BA, DSc); Royal School of Mines (BS)
- Known for: Calculus Made Easy (1910); Invention of the permeameter
- Scientific career
- Fields: Physics; Electrical engineering
- Workplaces: University College, Bristol; City and Guilds of London Institute; British Institute of Radiology; Institution of Electrical Engineers

Silvanus Phillips Thompson FRS (19 June 1851 – 12 June 1916) was an English professor of physics at the City and Guilds Technical College in Finsbury, England. He was elected to the Royal Society in 1891 and was known for his work as an electrical engineer and as an author. Thompson's most enduring publication is his 1910 text Calculus Made Easy, which teaches the fundamentals of infinitesimal calculus, and is still in print. Thompson also wrote a popular physics text, Elementary Lessons in Electricity and Magnetism, as well as biographies of Lord Kelvin and Michael Faraday.

== Biography ==
Thompson was born on 19 June 1851 to a Quaker family in York, England. His father served as a master at the Quaker Bootham School in York and he also studied there. In 1873 Silvanus Thompson was made the science master at the school. He graduated and sat for Bachelor of Arts University of London external degree in 1869. After a teaching apprenticeship he was awarded a scholarship to the Royal School of Mines (RSM) in South Kensington, where he studied chemistry and physics. He graduated with honors with a Bachelor of Science degree and started working at RSM. He soon became a Fellow of the Royal Astronomical and Physical Society; he participated in meetings—lectures with demonstrations of experiments organized at the Royal Institution.

On 11 February 1876 he heard Sir William Crookes give an evening discourse at the Royal Institution on The Mechanical Action of Light when Crookes demonstrated his light mill or radiometer. Thompson was intrigued and stimulated and developed a major interest in light and optics (his other main interest being electromagnetism). In 1876 he was appointed as a lecturer in physics at University College, Bristol, and later was made Professor in 1878 at the age of 27. He had received a D.Sc. from the University of London in 1878.

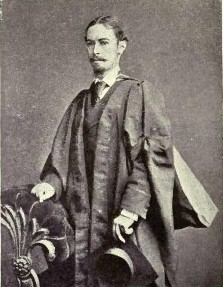
Silvanus Thompson, at about the age of 25.

A major concern of Thompson was the area of technical education and he made a series of continental tours to France, Germany and Switzerland to compare the continental approach to that in the UK. In 1879 he gave a paper at the Royal Society of Arts on Apprenticeship, Scientific and Unscientific in which he detailed the deficiencies in technical education in England. In the discussion, the opinion was expressed that England was too conservative to make use of trade schools and that continental methods would not be applicable in the UK. Thompson recognised that technical education was the means by which scientific knowledge could be put into action and spent the rest of his life putting his vision into practical realisation.

In 1878 the City and Guilds of London Institute for the Advancement of Technical Education was founded. Finsbury Technical College was a teaching institution created by the City and Guilds Institute and it was as its Principal and Professor of Physics that Thompson was to devote the next 30 years.

Thompson's particular gift was in his ability to communicate difficult scientific concepts in a clear and interesting manner. He attended and lectured at the Royal Institution giving the Christmas lectures in 1896 on Light, Visible and Invisible with an account of Röntgen Light. He was an impressive lecturer and the radiologist AE Barclay said that: "None who heard him could forget the vividness of the word-pictures he placed before them".

In 1891 Thompson developed the idea of a telegraph submarine cable that could increase the distance of the electrical pulse and therefore increase the speed of transmitting words across the telegraph cable. Until then there was an average speed of between 10 and 50 words per minute but his design was to counteract the discharging of electrical energy across the cable by introducing a return earth as part of the internal electrical structure of the cable (something like coaxial cable today). His idea, written about by Charles Bright in his book Submarine Telegraphs, discusses the idea that the two wires could be designed as separate conductors but along their path they would be connected by an induction coil. This would allow for the introduction of capacitance and therefore allow for the distance of the electrical charge to increase so increasing the word count. This was a design that would help revolutionise submarine telegraphy and the future of telephone submarine systems.

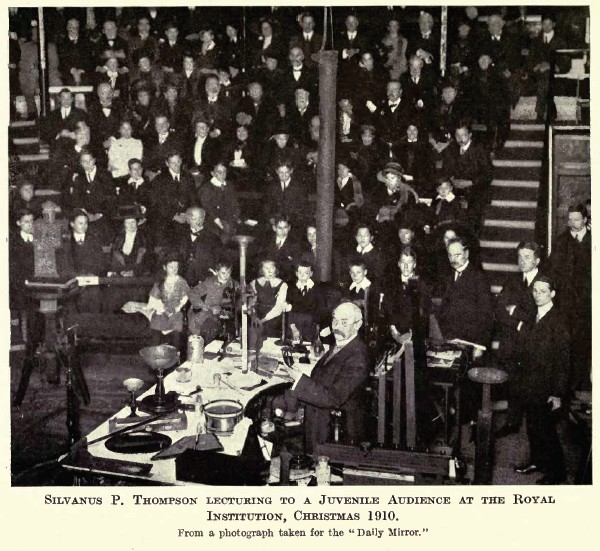
Silvanus Thompson presenting the 1910 Royal Institution Christmas Lecture

Thompson repeated Röntgen's experiments on the day after the discovery was announced in the UK and following this gave the first public demonstration of the new rays at the Clinical Society of London on 30 March 1896. William Hale-White said: "The audience was thrilled, most seeing for the first time actual pieces of bones and metal. Silvanus Thompson was a prince among lecturers. I have never heard a better demonstration or attended a more memorable medical meeting".

He was the first President of the Röntgen Society (later to become the British Institute of Radiology). He described the society as being between medicine, physics and photography. It was his genius that put its stamp on that society and has made it into the rich amalgam of medical, scientific and technical members that it is today. As he said in his presidential address to the Röntgen Society: "The pioneers have opened the way into the wilderness; they are now being followed by those who will occupy the new territory, complete its survey, and map out its features. Not until every corner is explored and charted will the work of our Society be ended".

In 1900 Thompson was involved in the controversial Whitehall attack on Marconi's patents, when the Post Office commissioned both him and Professor Oliver Lodge to produce secret reports. The purpose was either to declare the Marconi Company patents invalid, or to produce similar, but technically different equipment: the latter involved Thompson. When the Admiralty received the two reports it was the pioneer of wireless telegraphy Captain (later, Admiral Sir) Henry Jackson, then commanding HMS Vulcan, whose opinion led a senior naval officer to report, "it would be unworthy to try to evade the Marconi Company's patent."

Thompson was committed to truth in all aspects and his 1915 Swarthmore Lecture delivered to the Society of Friends was The Quest for Truth, indicating his belief in truth and integrity in all aspects of our lives. Thompson remained an active member of the Religious Society of Friends, throughout his life

He died in London, after a short illness, on 12 June 1916, leaving a widow and four daughters.

== Literary works ==
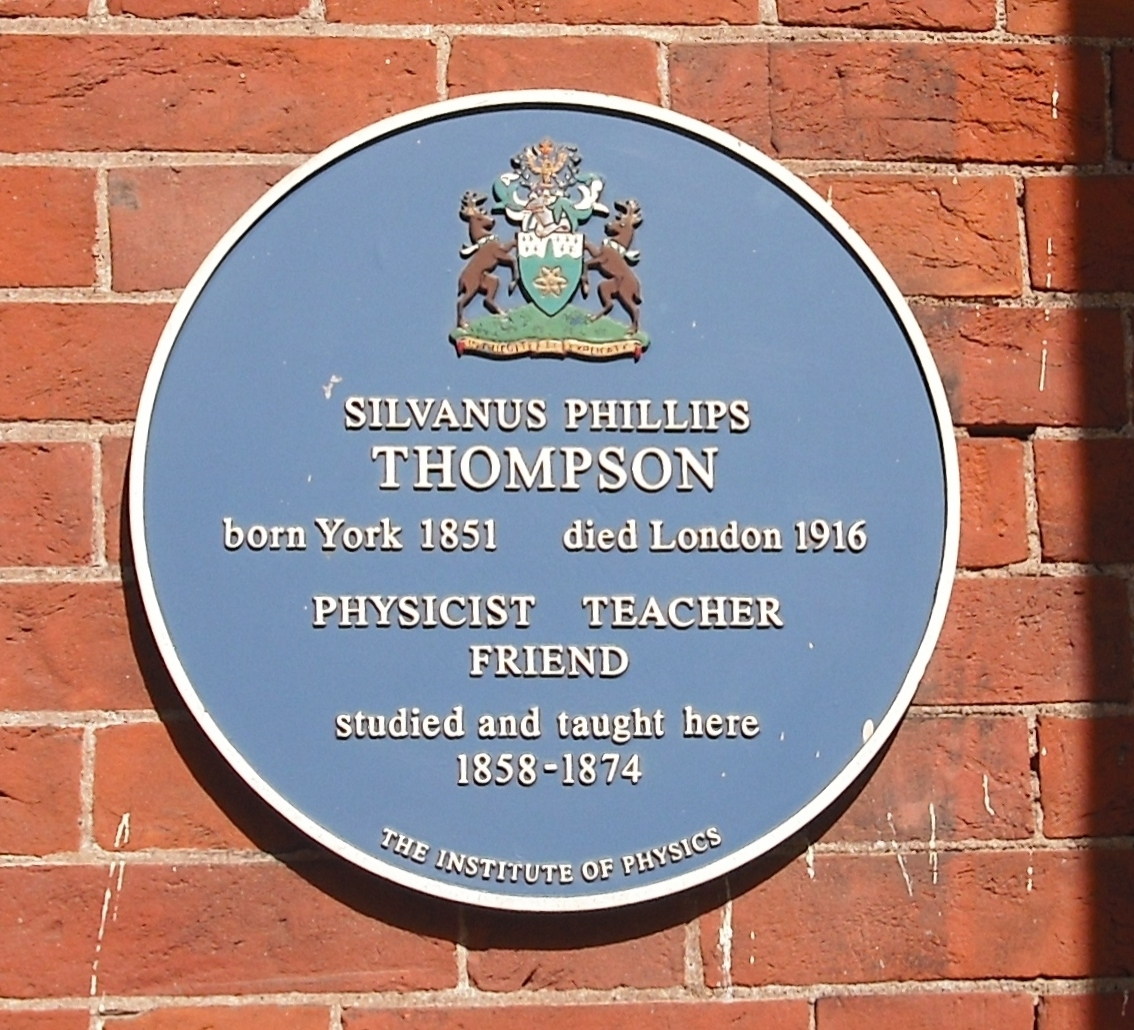
Plaque for Thompson, sponsored by the Institute of Physics, on the front of the main building at Bootham School, York.

Thompson wrote many books of a technical nature particularly Elementary Lessons in Electricity & Magnetism (1881), Dynamo-electric Machinery (1884) and the classic Calculus Made Easy which was first published in 1910, and is still in print.

Thompson had many interests including painting, literature, the history of science, and working in his greenhouse. He wrote biographies of Michael Faraday and Lord Kelvin. He also wrote about William Gilbert, the Elizabethan physician, and produced an edition of Gilbert's De Magnete at the Chiswick Press in 1900. In 1912, Thompson published the first English translation of Treatise on Light by Christiaan Huygens.

Thompson's scientific library of books is preserved at the Institution of Electrical Engineers. It includes classic books on electricity, magnetism and optics. The collection consists of 900 rare books and 2500 nineteenth and early twentieth century titles, with approximately 200 autograph letters.

- The Life of William Thomson, Baron Kelvin of Largs (1910), vol. 1, vol. 2

== Editions ==
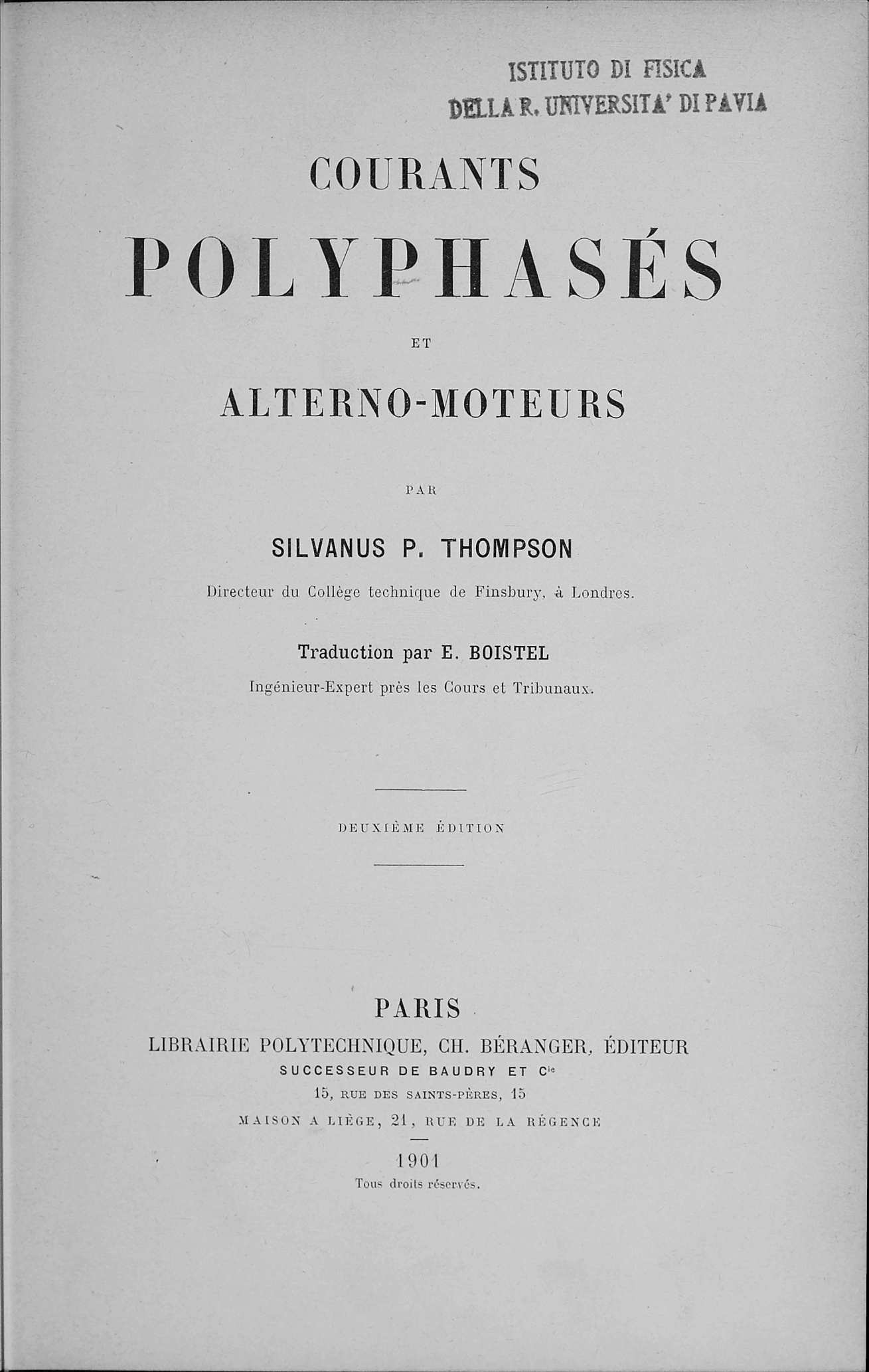
Polyphase electric currents and alternate-current motors, 1901

- Dynamo-electric machinery (in French). Paris: Baudry. 1886.
- Polyphase electric currents and alternate-current motors (in French). Paris: Béranger. 1901.

== Lectures ==
Thompson lectured at the Royal Institution giving the Christmas lectures in 1896 on Light, Visible and Invisible with an account of Röntgen Light.

In 1910 Thompson was invited to deliver the Royal Institution Christmas Lecture on Sound: Musical and Non-Musical.

== Honours ==
- Thompson is one of the individuals represented on the Engineers Walk in Bristol, England.
- Thompson was elected a Fellow of the Royal Society on 14 May 1891 and was elected a member of the Royal Swedish Academy of Sciences in 1894. In 1902, he was elected as a member to the American Philosophical Society.
- In 2016, a workshop was held at the Westminster Meeting House to commemorate the centenary of Thompson's death.

== Inventions ==
Thompson invented the permeameter.

In London, in 1910, Thompson was involved in early attempts to stimulate the brain using a magnetic field. Many years after his death the technique would eventually become refined as Transcranial Magnetic Stimulation.
