= Offshore freshened groundwater =

Water located in the sub-seafloor

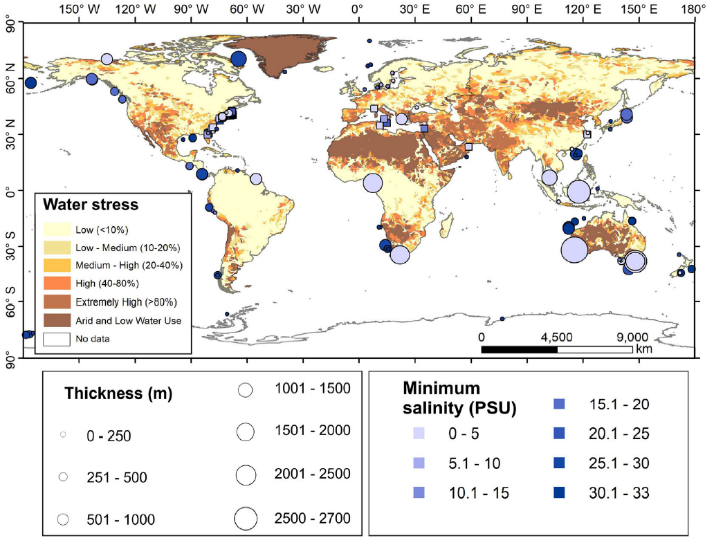
Fig. 1 Global map of water stress and distribution of OFG system, thickness and minimum salinity values. Square symbols represent area where OFG thickness is unknown

Offshore freshened groundwater (OFG) is water that contains a total dissolved solid (TDS) concentration lower than seawater, and which is hosted in porous sediments and rocks located in the sub-seafloor. OFG systems have been documented all over around the world and have an estimated global volume of around 1 million km^{3}. Their study is important because they may represent an unconventional source of potable water for human populations living near the coast, especially in areas where groundwater resources are scarce or facing stress.

== Elements and processes ==
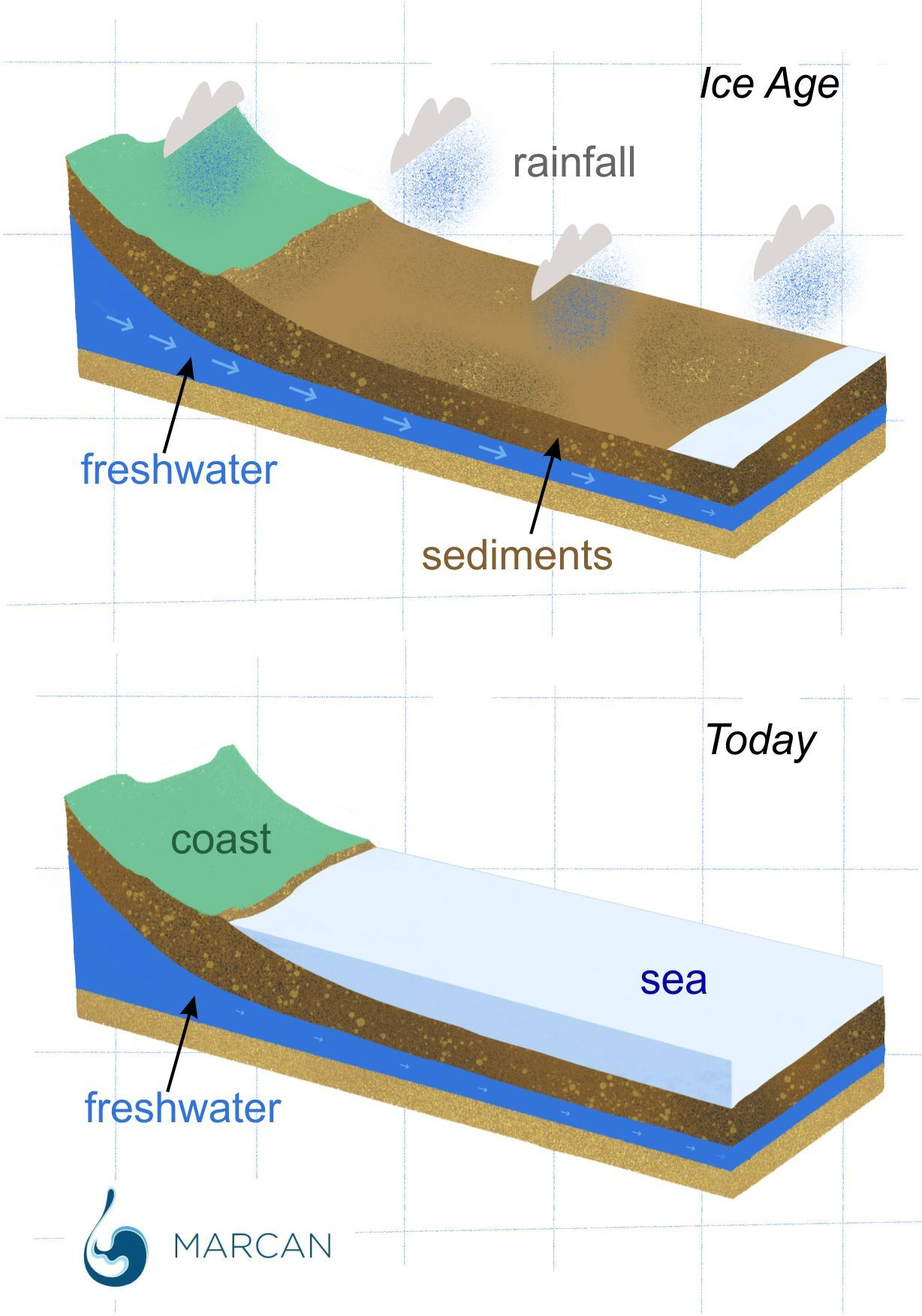
Fig. 2 Schematic figure showing how freshened groundwater was deposited offshore when the seafloor was exposed at lower sea-levels. Credit: MARCAN project

OFG usually presents salinity values < 33 Practical Salinity Units (PSU). They are located at water depth < 100 m and within 55 km of the coast in both siliciclastic and carbonatic aquifers along active and passive margins. OFG systems are usually composed by multiple OFG bodies which are altogether < 2 km thick (Fig.1)

The principal emplacement mechanisms for OFG systems are (from the most common to the least common):

- Meteoric recharge by rainfall which can be either a paleo-meteoric event during sea level low stands or an active-meteoric recharge via permeable connections between offshore and onshore aquifers (Fig. 2).
- Diagenesis due to post‐sedimentary alteration processes leading the release of freshwater and accumulation in deeply buried marine sediments in high pressure and temperature conditions .
- Sub‐glacial and pro‐glacial injection such as sub-glacial melting, sub-glacial drainage systems, reversal of groundwater flow direction with respect to modern flow patterns.
- Decomposition of gas hydrates as a result of changing in temperatures or pressures which lead to the release of low salinity pore water.

The geological settings have a major control on OFG development: the majority are hosted in coarser siliciclastic materials, with porosity values around 30% to 60%, constraint by a permeability contrast (predominantly sand to clay). Topographic gradients have a major impact on OFG emplacement as topography-driven flow is one of the most important mechanisms controlling discharge of freshwater offshore.

== Investigation ==
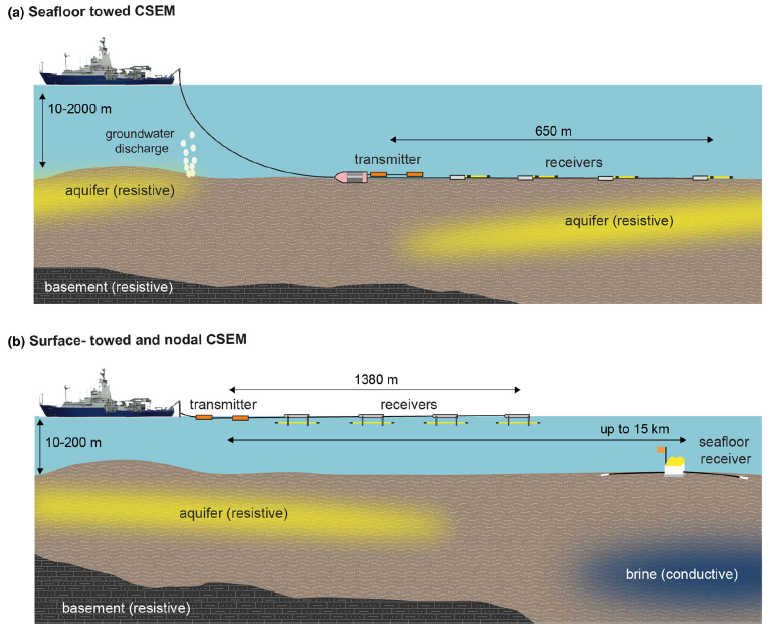
Fig. 3 CSEM systems in different configurations which can be used to map OFG

Different methods can be used to characterize and assess OFG occurrences:

- Drilling, coring and wireline logging methods lead to characterized both sediments (e.g. granulometry and hydraulic properties) and pore water via geochemical analysis (e.g. salinity and chloride concentrations). Resistivity, porosity, density, sonic velocities, gamma ray content, temperature, and flow meter measurements can be then determined via in-situ measurements.
- Reflection seismic methods provide indirect constraints on heterogeneities controlling OFG distribution. Electromagnetic (EM) surveying, usually collected using controlled source electromagnetic (CSEM) systems, is used to discriminate between saturated regions with saline water (less resistive) from those containing fresh groundwater (more resistive) (Fig. 3).
- Numerical modelling approaches can lead to quantifying OFG emplacement in continental shelf environments over geologic time scales

== Applications and potential of OFG ==
OFG systems are receiving increasing attention as they may be used as an unconventional source of potable water in coastal areas, where groundwater resources are being rapidly depleted or contaminated. 60% of the global population lives in areas of water stress defined as the ratio of total water withdrawals to available renewable surface and groundwater supplies (Fig.1). Climate change, rapid population growth, and urbanization have a negative impact on water stress especially in coastal communities. Therefore, OFG has been proposed as an alternative source of freshwater to mitigate water scarcity and groundwater depletion in areas of water stress
