= International Hydrological Decade =

The International Hydrological Decade (IHD), which ran from 1965 to 1974, was a programme that sought to defragmentize and develop the field of hydrology, which many researchers at the time considered to be stagnant. It was followed by the International Hydrological Programme.

The programme was conceived by a group of hydrologists at the Federal Council for Science and Technology.
