= Phreatic zone =

Zone in an aquifer below the water table

Cross-section of a hillslope depicting the vadose zone, capillary fringe, water table, and the phreatic or saturated zone. (Source: United States Geological Survey.)

Cross section showing the water table varying with surface topography as well as a perched water table

The phreatic zone, saturated zone, or zone of saturation, is the part of an aquifer, below the water table, in which all pores and fractures are saturated with water. The part above the water table is the vadose zone (also called unsaturated zone).

The phreatic zone size, color, and depth may fluctuate with changes of season, and during wet and dry periods. Depending on the characteristics of soil particles, their packing and porosity, the boundary of a saturated zone can be stable or instable, exhibiting fingering patterns known as Saffman–Taylor instability. Predicting the onset of stable vs. unstable drainage fronts is of some importance in modelling phreatic zone boundaries.

== See also ==
- Capillary fringe – Subsurface layer in which groundwater seeps up from a water table by capillary action
- Epiphreatic zone – Zone between the saturated and unsaturated zones
- Infiltration (hydrology) – Process by which water on the ground surface enters the soil
- Phreatic – Term used in several scientific disciplines
- Phreatophyte – Type of plant
- Vadose zone – Unsaturated aquifer above the water table
- Index: Aquifer articles
