= Permeameter =

The permeameter is an instrument for rapidly measuring the electromagnetic permeability of samples of iron or steel with sufficient accuracy for many commercial purposes. The name was first applied by Silvanus P. Thompson to an apparatus devised by himself in 1890, which indicates the mechanical force required to detach one end of the sample, arranged as the core of a straight electromagnet, from an iron yoke of special form; when this force is known, the permeability can be easily calculated.
