= Capillary fringe =

Subsurface layer in which groundwater seeps up from a water table by capillary action

Cross-section of a hillslope depicting the vadose zone, capillary fringe, water table, and saturated zone

The capillary fringe is the subsurface layer in which groundwater seeps up from a water table by capillary action to fill pores. Pores at the base of the capillary fringe are filled with water due to tension saturation. This saturated portion of the capillary fringe is less than the total capillary rise because of the presence of a mix in pore size. If the pore size is small and relatively uniform, it is possible that soils can be completely saturated with water for several feet above the water table. Alternately, when the pore size is large, the saturated portion will extend only a few inches above the water table. Capillary action supports a vadose zone above the saturated base, within which water content decreases with distance above the water table. In soils with a wide range in pore size, the unsaturated zone can be several times thicker than the saturated zone.

Some workers restrict their definition of the capillary fringe only to the tension-saturated base portion and exclude it wholly from the vadose zone. This is more common among workers addressing solute transport and water flow. Others define the capillary fringe as including both the tension-saturated and unsaturated portions. This is the preferred definition among workers dealing with the remediation of salt affected soils as well as those dealing with the vapor phase of soil processes and bioremediation. It is not uncommon to see the capillary fringe treated as a boundary condition separating the water table from the unsaturated zone, without defining it as a significant part of either.

== See also ==
- Epiphreatic zone – Zone between the saturated and unsaturated zones
- Infiltration (hydrology) – Process by which water on the ground surface enters the soil
- Phreatic – Term used in several scientific disciplines
- Phreatic zone – Zone in an aquifer below the water table
- Plume (fluid dynamics) – Column of one fluid moving through another
- Vadose zone – Unsaturated aquifer above the water table
