= Potentiometric surface =

A potentiometric surface is the imaginary plane where a given reservoir of fluid will "equalize out to" if allowed to flow. A potentiometric surface is based on hydraulic principles. For example, two connected storage tanks with one full and one empty will gradually fill/drain to the same level. This is because of atmospheric pressure and gravity. This idea is heavily used in city water supplies - a tall water tower containing the water supply has a great enough potentiometric surface to provide flowing water at a decent pressure to the houses it supplies.

For groundwater "potentiometric surface" is a synonym of "piezometric surface" which is an imaginary surface that defines the level to which water in a confined aquifer would rise were it completely pierced with wells. If the potentiometric surface lies above the ground surface, a flowing artesian well results. Contour maps and profiles of the potentiometric surface can be prepared from the well data.

== See also ==
- Hydraulic head
