= Phreatic =

Term used in several scientific disciplines

Phreatic is a term used in hydrology to refer to aquifers, in speleology to refer to cave passages, and in volcanology to refer to a type of volcanic eruption.

== Hydrology ==
The term phreatic (the word originates from the Greek phrear, phreat- meaning "well" or "spring") is used in hydrology and the earth sciences to refer to matters relating to groundwater (an aquifer) below the water table. The term 'phreatic surface' indicates the location where the pore water pressure is under atmospheric conditions (i.e., the pressure head is zero). This surface usually coincides with the water table. The slope of the phreatic surface is assumed to indicate the direction of groundwater movement in an unconfined aquifer.

The phreatic zone, below the phreatic surface where rock and soil are saturated with water, is the counterpart of the vadose zone, or unsaturated zone, above. Unconfined aquifers are also called phreatic aquifers because the phreatic surface provides their upper boundary.

== Speleology ==
In speleogenesis, a division of speleology, 'phreatic action' forms cave passages by dissolving the limestone in all directions, as opposed to 'vadose action', whereby a stream running in a cave passage erodes a trench in the floor. It occurs when the passage is full of water, and therefore normally only when it is below the water table, and only if the water is not saturated with calcium carbonate or calcium magnesium carbonate. A cave passage formed in this way is characteristically circular or oval in cross-section as limestone is dissolved on all surfaces.

Many cave passages are formed by a combination of phreatic action followed by vadose action. Such passages form a keyhole cross-section: a round-shaped section at the top and a rectangular trench at the bottom.

== Volcanology ==
A phreatic or steam-blast eruption occurs when magma heats ground or surface water.

== Biology ==
Phreatobites are animals living within the phreatic zone of groundwater aquifers.

Phreatophytes are deep-rooted plants that obtain a significant portion of the water that it needs from the phreatic zone or near it.

== See also ==
- Phreatic zone – Zone in an aquifer below the water table
- Vadose zone – Unsaturated aquifer above the water table
- Water content – Quantity of water contained in a material
- Category: Aquifer articles
