= Hydraulic tomography =

Use of multiple hydraulic tests to characterize an aquifer

Hydraulic tomography (HT) is a sequential cross-hole hydraulic test followed by inversion of all the data to map the spatial distribution of aquifer hydraulic properties. Specifically, HT involves installation of multiple wells in an aquifer, which are partitioned into several intervals along the depth using packers. A sequential aquifer test at selected intervals is then conducted. During the test, water is injected or withdrawn (i.e. a pressure excitation) at a selected interval in a given well. Pressure responses of the subsurface are then monitored at other intervals at this well and also in other wells. This test produces a set of pressure excitation/response data of the subsurface.

Once a given test has been completed, the pump is moved to another interval and the test is repeated to collect another set of data. The same procedure is then applied to the intervals at other wells. Afterward, the data sets from all tests are processed by a mathematical model to estimate the spatial distribution of hydraulic properties of the aquifer. These pairs of pumping and drawdown data sets at different locations make an inverse problem better posed, because each pair cross-validates the others such that the estimates become less non-unique. In other words, predictions of ground water flow based on the HT estimates will be more accurate and less uncertain than those based on estimates from traditional site-characterization approaches and model calibrations.
