= International Hydrological Programme =

Organization

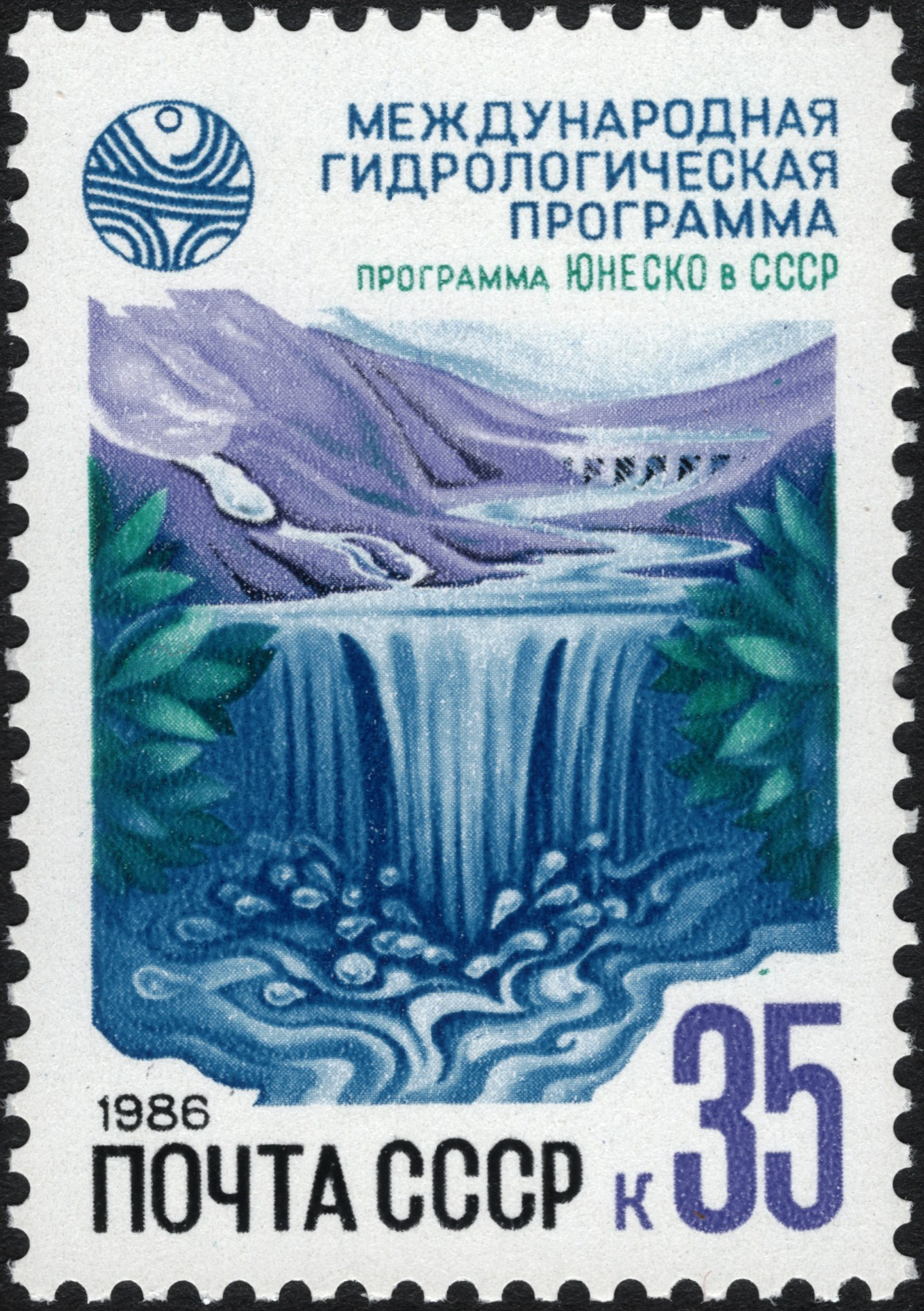
International Hydrological Programme (IHP) emblem on postage stamp

The Intergovernmental Hydrological Programme, formerly the International Hydrological Programme (IHP), is UNESCO’s international scientific cooperative program in water research, water resource management, water education, and capacity-building, and the only broadly based science program of the UN system in this area. The IHP was established in 1975 following the International Hydrological Decade (1965-1974). The program is tailored to the needs of UNESCO's 195 Member States and is implemented in six-year phases, allowing it to adapt to the changing world.

The current phase (IHP VIII: 2014–2021) is titled Water Security Responses to Regional and Global Challenges (2014-2021), and it is based on the principle of continuity with change, building on lessons and results from earlier phases of the program. It continues to promote and lead international hydrological research, facilitate education and capacity development and enhance governance in water resources management. The aim of these efforts is to help meet the UN Millennium Development Goals on environmental sustainability, water supply, sanitation, food security and poverty alleviation. The results of this phase aim to be practical so both scientific communities and civil societies can apply and benefit from them.

The IHP Intergovernmental Council is responsible for defining priorities and supervising execution of IHP. The council is composed of 36 UNESCO Member States elected by UNESCO's General Conference at its ordinary sessions every two years. Each of UNESCO's six electoral regions elects Member States for membership in the council. The term lasts four years, and members are eligible for immediate re-election. For continuity, only half of the current Council members are elected each second year for the four-year period, so that in each biennium only half the members are newcomers and the rest are halfway through their term. The council normally meets once every two years, although extraordinary sessions may be convened under the conditions specified in the Rules of Procedure.

At the beginning of its first session, the council elects a chairperson and four vice-chairpersons. These constitute the IHP Bureau, which is responsible for coordinating sessions of the council and its committees, supervising implementation and reporting on the council's resolutions, and discharging all other duties which it is assigned by the council.

IHP's activities are implemented by the efforts of its secretariat, located in UNESCO headquarters in Paris. The secretariat provides studies, information, and the facilities needed to employ the program's activities. The backbone of IHP, however, is the network of National Committees. They are fundamental to ensuring the widest possible participation of Member States in IHP programs. The committees are run under the authority of National Governments and are responsible for implementing IHP initiatives.

== Initiatives ==
Several working groups have been developed under the umbrella of the International Hydrological Programme as the UNESCO Land Subsidence International Initiative, LASII (former UNESCO Working Group on Land Subsidence).

Another initiative is the International Groundwater Resources Assessment Centre (IGRAC) established in 2003. IGRAC works to facilitate sustainable groundwater resources across the world. They are based in the Netherlands.

== Directors ==
- Blanca Elena Jiménez Cisneros (2012–2018)
- Youssef Filali-Meknassi (2019–2020)
