= Vadose zone =

Unsaturated aquifer above the water table

Cross-section of a hillslope depicting the vadose zone, capillary fringe, water table, and phreatic or saturated zone. (Source: United States Geological Survey.)

Cross section showing the water table varying with surface topography as well as a perched water table

The vadose zone (from the Latin word for "shallow"), also termed the unsaturated zone, is the part of Earth between the land surface and the top of the phreatic zone, the position at which the groundwater (the water in the soil's pores) is at atmospheric pressure. Hence, the vadose zone extends from the top of the ground surface to the water table.

Water in the vadose zone has a pressure head less than atmospheric pressure, and is retained by a combination of adhesion (funiculary groundwater), and capillary action (capillary groundwater). If the vadose zone envelops soil, the water contained therein is termed soil moisture. In fine grained soils, capillary action can cause the pores of the soil to be fully saturated above the water table at a pressure less than atmospheric. The vadose zone does not include the area that is still saturated above the water table, often referred to as the capillary fringe.

Movement of water within the vadose zone is studied within soil physics and hydrology, particularly hydrogeology, and is of importance to agriculture, contaminant transport, and flood control. The Richards equation is often used to mathematically describe the flow of water, which is based partially on Darcy's law. Groundwater recharge, which is an important process that refills aquifers, generally occurs through the vadose zone from precipitation.

== In hydrology ==
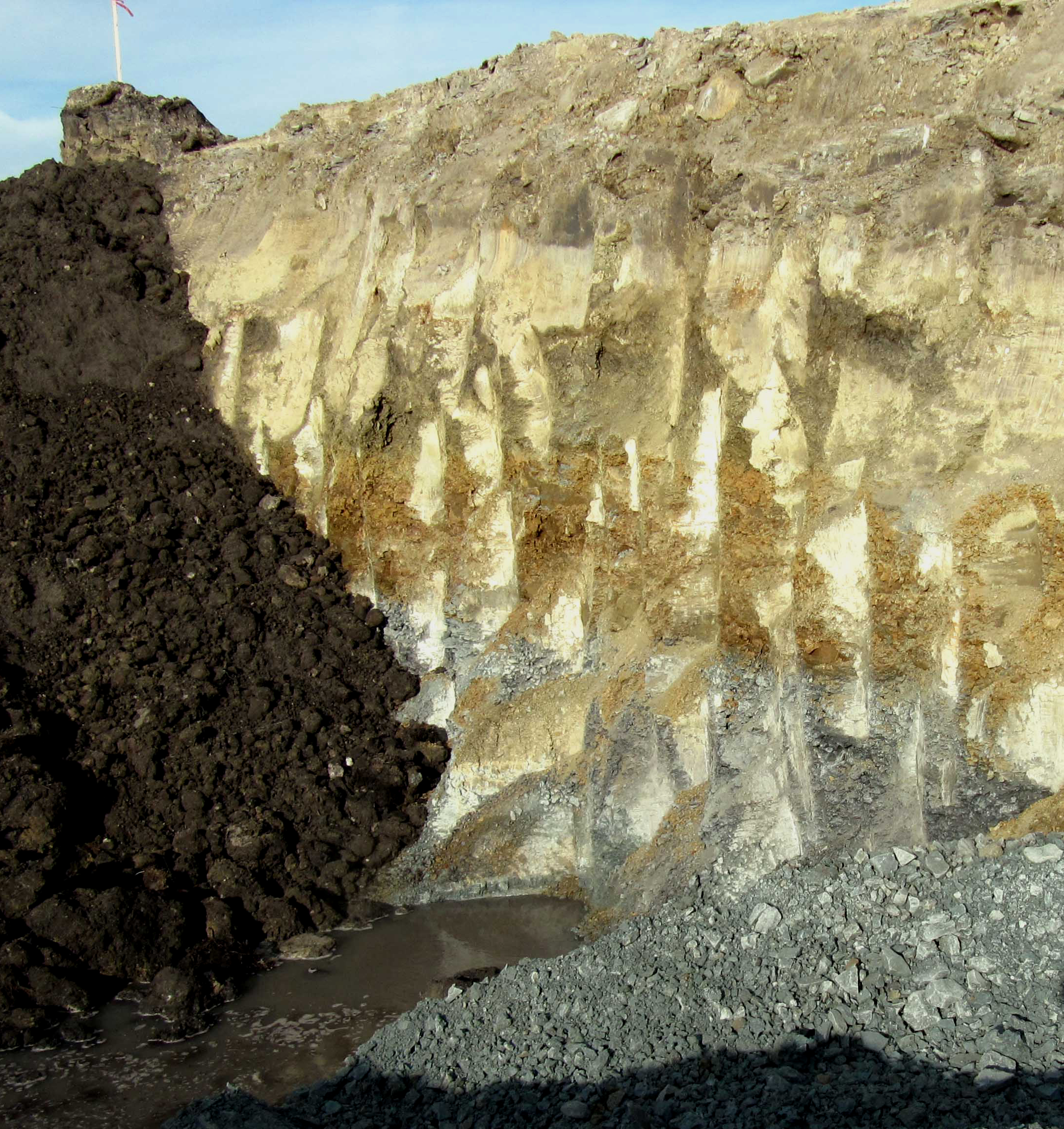
The sharp contact between the vadose zone (brown oxidized mudstone) and the underlying phreatic zone (grey unoxidized mudstone) exposed at a construction site.

The vadose zone is the undersaturated portion of the subsurface that lies above the groundwater table. The soil and rock in the vadose zone are not fully saturated with water; that is, the pores within them contain air as well as water. The portion of the vadose zone that is inhabited by soil microorganism, fungi and plant roots may sometimes be called the soil carbon sponge.

In some places, the vadose zone is absent, as is common where there are lakes and marshes, and in some places, it is hundreds of meters thick, as is common in arid regions.

Unlike the aquifers of the underlying water-saturated phreatic zone, the vadose zone is not a source of readily available water for human consumption. It is of great importance in providing water and nutrients that are vital to the soil carbon sponge and the biosphere. It is intensively used for the cultivation of plants, construction of buildings, and disposal of waste.

The vadose zone is often the main factor controlling water movement from the land surface to the aquifer. Thus, it strongly affects the rate of aquifer recharge and is critical for the use and management of groundwater. Flow rates and chemical reactions in the vadose zone also control whether, where, and how fast contaminants enter groundwater supplies. Understanding of vadose-zone processes is therefore crucial in determining the amount and quality of groundwater that is available for human use.

== In speleology ==
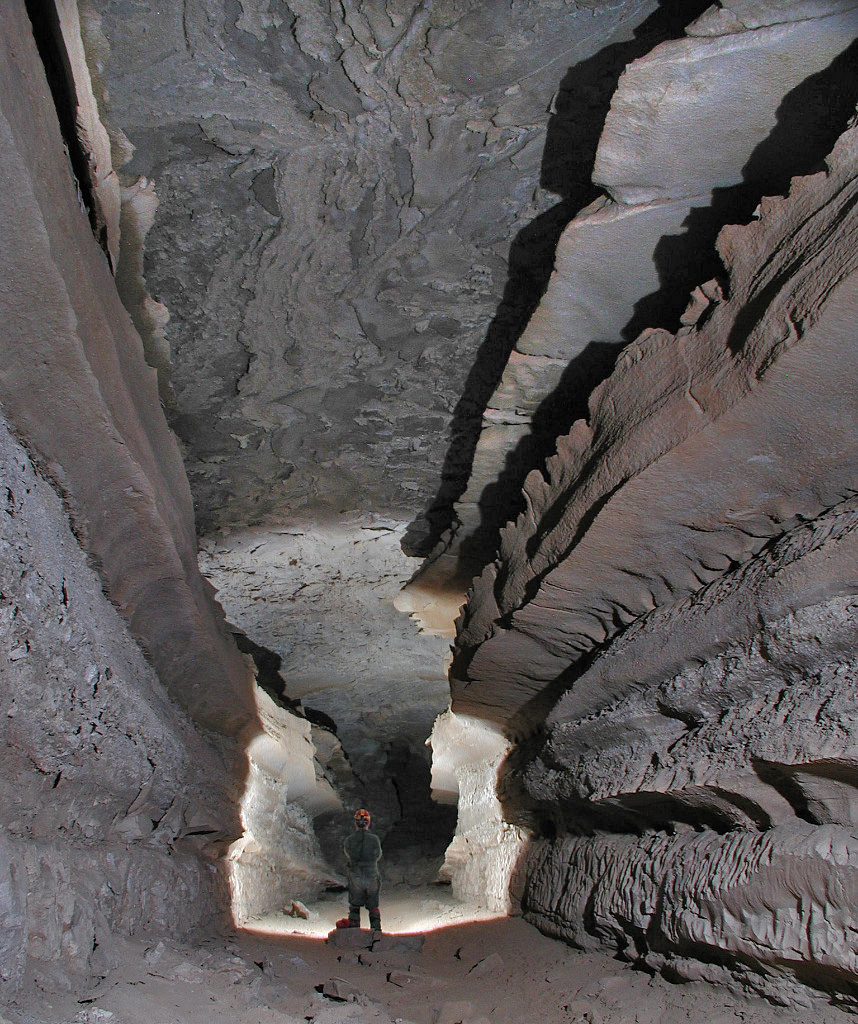
An example of a vadose cave passage in Mammoth Cave, Kentucky

In speleology, cave passages formed in the vadose zone tend to be canyon-like in shape, as the water dissolves bedrock on the floor of the passage. Passages created in completely water-filled conditions are called phreatic passages and tend to be circular in cross-section.

== See also ==
- Aquifer – Underground water-bearing rock
- Capillary fringe – Subsurface layer in which groundwater seeps up from a water table by capillary action
- Epiphreatic zone – Zone between the saturated and unsaturated zones
- Groundwater – Water located beneath the ground surface
- Infiltration (hydrology) – Process by which water on the ground surface enters the soil
- Phreatic zone – Zone in an aquifer below the water table
- Water retention curve – Relationship between water and soil
