= Aquifer =

Underground water-bearing rock

Schematic of an aquifer showing confined zones, groundwater travel times, a spring and a well

An aquifer is an underground layer of water-bearing material consisting of permeable, porous, or fractured rock, or of unconsolidated materials (gravel, sand, or silt). Aquifers vary greatly in their characteristics. The study of water flow in aquifers and the characterization of aquifers is called hydrogeology. Related concepts include aquitard, a bed of low permeability along an aquifer, and aquiclude (or aquifuge), a solid and impermeable region underlying or overlying an aquifer, the pressure of which could lead to the formation of a confined aquifer. Aquifers can be classified as saturated versus unsaturated, aquifers versus aquitards, confined versus unconfined, isotropic versus anisotropic, and porous, karst, fractured, or transboundary.

Groundwater from aquifers can be sustainably harvested by humans through the use of wells. This groundwater can be used as drinking water and for agricultural and industrial purposes. Environmental issues related with groundwater include overdrafting (extracting groundwater beyond the equilibrium yield of the aquifer), groundwater-related subsidence of land, salinization and pollution.

== Etymology ==
The word aquifer is derived from the latin prefix aqui-, the combining form of aqua meaning "water," and suffix -fer, meaning "bearing."

== Properties ==
=== Depth ===
An aquifer cross-section. This diagram shows two aquifers with one aquitard (a confining or impermeable layer) between them, surrounded by the bedrock aquiclude, which is in contact with a gaining stream (typical in humid regions). The water table and unsaturated zone are also illustrated.

Aquifers occur from near-surface to deeper than 9,000 metres (30,000 ft). Those closer to the surface are not only more likely to be used for water supply and irrigation, but are also more likely to be replenished by local rainfall. Although aquifers are sometimes characterized as "underground rivers or lakes," they are actually porous rock saturated with water.

Many desert areas have limestone hills or mountains within them or close to them that can be exploited as groundwater resources. Part of the Atlas Mountains in North Africa, the Lebanon and Anti-Lebanon ranges between Syria and Lebanon, the Jebel Akhdar in Oman, parts of the Sierra Nevada and neighboring ranges in the United States' Southwest, have shallow aquifers that are exploited for their water. Overexploitation can lead to the exceeding of the practical sustained yield; i.e., more water is taken out than can be replenished.

Along the coastlines of certain countries, such as Libya and Israel, increased water usage associated with population growth has caused a lowering of the water table and the subsequent contamination of the groundwater with saltwater from the sea.

In 2013, large aquifers containing offshore freshened groundwater were discovered under continental shelves of Australia, China, North America and South Africa. They contain an estimated half a million cubic kilometers of "low salinity" water that could be economically processed into potable water. The reserves formed when ocean levels were lower and rainwater made its way into the ground in land areas that were not submerged until the ice age ended 20,000 years ago. The volume is estimated to be 100 times the amount of water extracted from other aquifers since 1900.

=== Groundwater recharge ===
Groundwater recharge or deep drainage or deep percolation is a hydrologic process, where water moves downward from surface water to groundwater. Recharge is the primary method through which water enters an aquifer. This process usually occurs in the vadose zone below plant roots and is often expressed as a flux to the water table surface. Groundwater recharge also encompasses water moving away from the water table farther into the saturated zone. Recharge occurs both naturally (through the water cycle) and through anthropogenic processes (i.e., "artificial groundwater recharge"), where rainwater and/or reclaimed water is routed to the subsurface.

== Classification ==
An aquitard is a zone within the Earth that restricts the flow of groundwater from one aquifer to another. An aquitard can sometimes, if completely impermeable, be called an aquiclude or aquifuge. Aquitards are composed of layers of either clay or non-porous rock with low hydraulic conductivity.

=== Saturated versus unsaturated ===
Groundwater can be found at nearly every point in the Earth's shallow subsurface to some degree, although aquifers do not necessarily contain fresh water. The Earth's crust can be divided into two regions: the saturated zone or phreatic zone (e.g., aquifers, aquitards, etc.), where all available spaces are filled with water, and the unsaturated zone (also called the vadose zone), where there are still pockets of air that contain some water, but can be filled with more water.

Saturated means the pressure head of the water is greater than atmospheric pressure (it has a gauge pressure > 0). The definition of the water table is the surface where the pressure head is equal to atmospheric pressure (where gauge pressure = 0).

Unsaturated conditions occur above the water table where the pressure head is negative (absolute pressure can never be negative, but gauge pressure can) and the water that incompletely fills the pores of the aquifer material is under suction. The water content in the unsaturated zone is held in place by surface adhesive forces and it rises above the water table (the zero-gauge-pressure isobar) by capillary action to saturate a small zone above the phreatic surface (the capillary fringe) at less than atmospheric pressure. This is termed tension saturation and is not the same as saturation on a water-content basis. Water content in a capillary fringe decreases with increasing distance from the phreatic surface. The capillary head depends on soil pore size. In sandy soils with larger pores, the head will be less than in clay soils with very small pores. The normal capillary rise in a clayey soil is less than 1.8 m (6 ft) but can range between 0.3 and 10 m (1 and 33 ft).

The capillary rise of water in a small-diameter tube involves the same physical process. The water table is the level to which water will rise in a large-diameter pipe (e.g., a well) that goes down into the aquifer and is open to the atmosphere.

=== Aquifers versus aquitards ===
Aquifers are typically saturated regions of the subsurface that produce an economically feasible quantity of water to a well or spring (e.g., sand and gravel or fractured bedrock often make good aquifer materials).

An aquitard is a zone within the Earth that restricts the flow of groundwater from one aquifer to another. A completely impermeable aquitard is called an aquiclude or aquifuge. Aquitards contain layers of either clay or non-porous rock with low hydraulic conductivity.

In mountainous areas especially near rivers, the main aquifers are typically unconsolidated alluvium, that is horizontal layers of materials deposited by water processes such as rivers and streams. In cross-section, they appear as layers of alternating coarse and fine materials. Coarse materials, because of the high energy needed to move them, tend to be found nearer to their source, such as mountain fronts or rivers, whereas the fine-grained material travels farther, to the flatter parts of the basin or overbank areas—sometimes called the pressure area. Since there are less fine-grained deposits near the source, those aquifers, also known as the fore-bay area, are often unconfined or in hydraulic communication with the land surface.

=== Confined versus unconfined ===
An unconfined aquifer has no impermeable barrier immediately above it, such that the water level can rise in response to recharge. A confined aquifer has an overlying impermeable barrier that prevents the water level in the aquifer from rising any higher. An aquifer in the same geologic unit may be confined in one area and unconfined in another. Unconfined aquifers are sometimes also called water table or phreatic aquifers, because their upper boundary is the water table or phreatic surface (see Biscayne Aquifer). Typically (but not always) the shallowest aquifer at a given location is unconfined, meaning it does not have a confining layer (an aquitard or aquiclude) between it and the surface. The term "perched" refers to ground water accumulating above a low-permeability unit or strata, such as a clay layer. This term is generally used to refer to a small local area of ground water that occurs at an elevation higher than a regionally extensive aquifer. The difference between perched and unconfined aquifers is their size (perched is smaller). Confined aquifers are aquifers that are overlain by a confining layer, often made up of clay. The confining layer might offer some protection from surface contamination.

If the distinction between confined and unconfined is not clear geologically (i.e., if it is not known if a clear confining layer exists, or if the geology is more complex, e.g., a fractured bedrock aquifer), the value of storativity returned from an aquifer test can be used to determine it (although aquifer tests in unconfined aquifers should be interpreted differently than confined ones). Confined aquifers have very low storativity values (much less than 0.01, and as little as 10^{−5}), which means that the aquifer is storing water using the mechanisms of aquifer matrix expansion and the compressibility of water, which typically are both quite small quantities. Unconfined aquifers have storativities (typically called specific yield) greater than 0.01 (1% of bulk volume); they release water from storage by the mechanism of actually draining the pores of the aquifer, releasing relatively large amounts of water (up to the drainable porosity of the aquifer material, or the minimum volumetric water content).

=== Isotropic versus anisotropic ===
In isotropic aquifers or aquifer layers the hydraulic conductivity (K) is equal for flow in all directions, while in anisotropic conditions it differs, notably in horizontal (Kh) and vertical (Kv) sense.

Semi-confined aquifers with one or more aquitards work as an anisotropic system, even when the separate layers are isotropic, because the compound Kh and Kv values are different (see hydraulic transmissivity and hydraulic resistance).

When calculating flow to drains or flow to wells in an aquifer, the anisotropy is to be taken into account lest the resulting design of the drainage system may be faulty.

=== Porous, karst, or fractured ===
To properly manage an aquifer its properties must be understood. Many properties must be known to predict how an aquifer will respond to rainfall, drought, pumping, and contamination. Considerations include where and how much water enters the groundwater from rainfall and snowmelt, how fast and in what direction the groundwater travels, and how much water leaves the ground as springs. Computer models can be used to test how accurately the understanding of the aquifer properties matches the actual aquifer performance. Environmental regulations require sites with potential sources of contamination to demonstrate that the hydrology has been characterized.

==== Porous ====
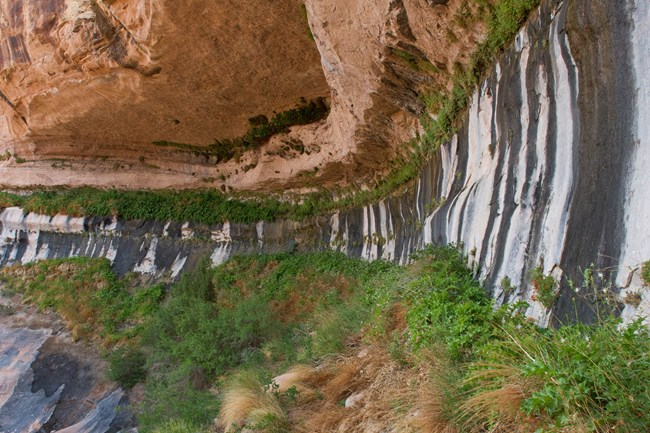
Water in porous aquifers slowly seeps through pore spaces between sand grains

Porous aquifers typically occur in sand and sandstone. Their properties depend on the depositional sedimentary environment and later natural cementation of the sand grains. The environment where a sand body was deposited controls the orientation of the sand grains, the horizontal and vertical variations, and the distribution of shale layers. Even thin shale layers are important barriers to groundwater flow. All these factors affect the porosity and permeability of sandy aquifers.

Sandy deposits formed in shallow marine environments and in windblown sand dune environments have moderate to high permeability while sandy deposits formed in river environments have low to moderate permeability. Rainfall and snowmelt enter the groundwater where the aquifer is near the surface. Groundwater flow directions can be determined from potentiometric surface maps of water levels in wells and springs. Aquifer tests and well tests can be used with Darcy's law flow equations to determine the ability of a porous aquifer to convey water.

Analyzing this type of information over an area gives an indication how much water can be pumped without overdrafting and how contamination will travel. In porous aquifers groundwater flows as slow seepage in pores between sand grains. A groundwater flow rate of 1 foot per day (0.3 m/d) is considered to be a high rate for porous aquifers, as illustrated by the water slowly seeping from sandstone in the accompanying image to the left.

Porosity is important, but, alone, it does not determine a rock's ability to act as an aquifer. Areas of the Deccan Traps, a basaltic lava formation in west-central India, are examples of rock formations with high porosity but low permeability, making them poor aquifers. Similarly, the micro-porous (Upper Cretaceous) Chalk Group of south east England, although having a reasonably high porosity, has a low grain-to-grain permeability, with its good water-yielding characteristics mostly due to micro-fracturing and fissuring.

==== Karst ====
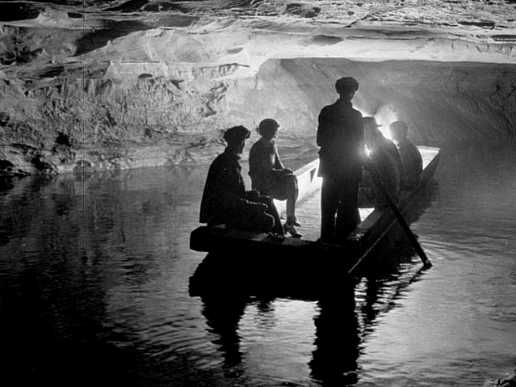
Water in karst aquifers can form subterranean rivers.

Karst aquifers typically develop in limestone. Surface water containing natural carbonic acid moves down into small fissures in limestone. This carbonic acid gradually dissolves limestone thereby enlarging the fissures. The enlarged fissures allow a larger quantity of water to enter which leads to a progressive enlargement of openings. Abundant small openings store a large quantity of water. The larger openings form a conduit system that drains the aquifer to springs.

Characterization of karst aquifers requires field exploration to locate sinkholes, swallets, sinking streams, and springs in addition to studying geological maps. Conventional hydrogeologic methods such as aquifer tests and potentiometric mapping are insufficient to characterize the complexity of karst aquifers. These conventional investigation methods need to be supplemented with dye traces, measurement of spring discharges, and analysis of water chemistry. U.S. Geological Survey dye tracing has determined that conventional groundwater models that assume a uniform distribution of porosity are not applicable for karst aquifers.

Linear alignment of surface features such as straight stream segments and sinkholes develop along fracture traces. Locating a well in a fracture trace or intersection of fracture traces increases the likelihood to encounter good water production. Voids in karst aquifers can be large enough to cause destructive collapse or subsidence of the ground surface that can initiate a catastrophic release of contaminants. Groundwater flow rate in karst aquifers is much more rapid than in porous aquifers as shown in the accompanying image to the left. For example, in the Barton Springs Edwards aquifer, dye traces measured the karst groundwater flow rates from 0.5 to 7 miles per day (0.8 to 11.3 km/d). The rapid groundwater flow rates make karst aquifers much more sensitive to groundwater contamination than porous aquifers.

In the extreme case, groundwater may exist in underground rivers (e.g., caves underlying karst topography).

==== Fractured ====
If a rock unit of low porosity is highly fractured, it can also make a good aquifer (via fissure flow), provided the rock has a hydraulic conductivity sufficient to facilitate movement of water.

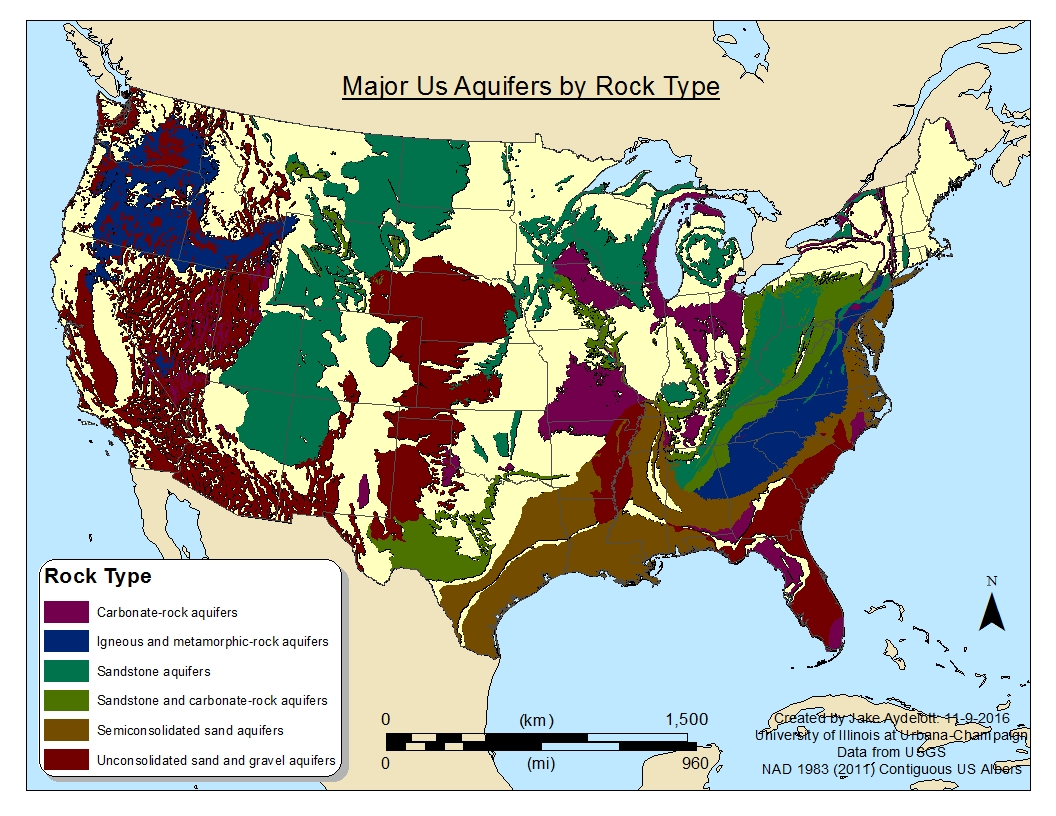
Map of major US aquifers by rock type

==== Undersea ====
Remote sensing in 2015 and direct sampling in 2025 discovered an undersea reservoir of fresh water off the coast of Nantucket, stretching possibly from New Jersey to Maine and thus representing one of the largest freshwater aquifers in the United States. The aquifer itself may represent glacial meltwater once overlain by dry land that subsequently was flooded by rising sea levels—as caused by the Holocene glacial retreat. Or it, (the aquifer) may maintain long-term groundwater flow connections along the US east coast, and thereby is recharged even today by contemporary rainfall over coastal surface lands.

== Human use of groundwater ==
Reliance on groundwater will only increase, mainly due to growing water demand by all sectors combined with increasing variation in rainfall patterns. Safe use of groundwater varies substantially by the elements present and use-cases, with significant differences between consumption for humans, livestocks and different crops.

Challenges for using groundwater include: overdrafting (extracting groundwater beyond the equilibrium yield of the aquifer), groundwater-related subsidence of land, groundwater becoming saline, and groundwater pollution.

== By country or continent ==
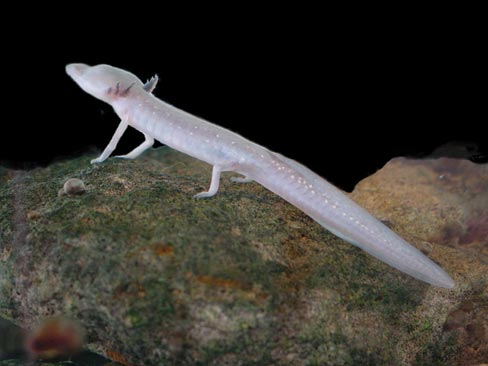
Texas blind salamander found in Edwards Aquifer

=== Africa ===
Aquifer depletion is a problem in some areas, especially in northern Africa, where one example is the Great Manmade River project of Libya. However, new methods of groundwater management such as artificial recharge and injection of surface waters during seasonal wet periods has extended the life of many freshwater aquifers, especially in the United States.

=== Australia ===
The Great Artesian Basin situated in Australia is arguably the largest groundwater aquifer in the world (over 1.7 million km^{2} or 0.66 million sq mi). It plays a large part in water supplies for Queensland, some remote parts of South Australia and most of the Northern Territory.

=== Canada ===
Discontinuous sand bodies at the base of the McMurray Formation in the Athabasca Oil Sands region of northeastern Alberta, Canada, are commonly referred to as the Basal Water Sand (BWS) aquifers. Saturated with water, they are confined beneath impermeable bitumen-saturated sands that are exploited to recover bitumen for synthetic crude oil production. Where they are deep-lying and recharge occurs from underlying Devonian formations they are saline, and where they are shallow and recharged by surface water they are non-saline. The BWS typically pose problems for the recovery of bitumen, whether by open-pit mining or by in situ methods such as steam-assisted gravity drainage (SAGD), and in some areas they are targets for waste-water injection.

=== South America ===
The Guarani Aquifer, located beneath the surface of Argentina, Brazil, Paraguay, and Uruguay, is one of the world's largest aquifer systems and is an important source of fresh water. Named after the Guarani people, it covers 1,200,000 km^{2} (460,000 sq mi), with a volume of about 40,000 km^{3} (9,600 cu mi), a thickness of between 50 and 800 m (160 and 2,620 ft) and a maximum depth of about 1,800 m (5,900 ft).

=== United States ===
The Ogallala Aquifer of the central United States is one of the world's great aquifers, but in places it is being rapidly depleted by growing municipal use, and continuing agricultural use. This huge aquifer, which underlies portions of eight states, contains primarily fossil water from the time of the last glaciation. Annual recharge, in the more arid parts of the aquifer, is estimated to total only about 10 percent of annual withdrawals. According to a 2013 report by the United States Geological Survey (USGS), the depletion between 2001 and 2008, inclusive, is about 32 percent of the cumulative depletion during the entire 20th century.

In the United States, the biggest users of water from aquifers include agricultural irrigation and oil and coal extraction. "Cumulative total groundwater depletion in the United States accelerated in the late 1940s and continued at an almost steady linear rate through the end of the century. In addition to widely recognized environmental consequences, groundwater depletion also adversely impacts the long-term sustainability of groundwater supplies to help meet the Nation's water needs."

An example of a significant and sustainable carbonate aquifer is the Edwards Aquifer in central Texas. This carbonate aquifer has historically been providing high quality water for nearly 2 million people, and even today, is full because of tremendous recharge from a number of area streams, rivers and lakes. The primary risk to this resource is human development over the recharge areas.

== See also ==
- Aquifer storage and recovery – Injection of water into an aquifer for later use
- Aquifer Susceptibility – Ability of permeable rock to hold liquids
- Artesian aquifer – Naturally-pressurized water source
- Catchment hydrology – Hydrology of drainage basins
- Hydraulic tomography – Use of multiple hydraulic tests to characterize an aquifer
- Overexploitation – Depleting a renewable resource
- Seasonal thermal energy storage – Storage of heat or cold for periods of up to several months
- Spring (hydrology) – Point at which water emerges from an aquifer to the surface
- Surficial aquifer – Shallow, thin aquifer
