= Runoff (hydrology) =

Flow of water across the earth

Runoff is the flow of water across the earth, and is a major component in the hydrological cycle. Runoff that flows over land before reaching a watercourse is referred to as surface runoff or overland flow. Once in a watercourse, runoff is referred to as streamflow, channel runoff, or river runoff. Urban runoff is surface runoff created by urbanization.

== Background ==
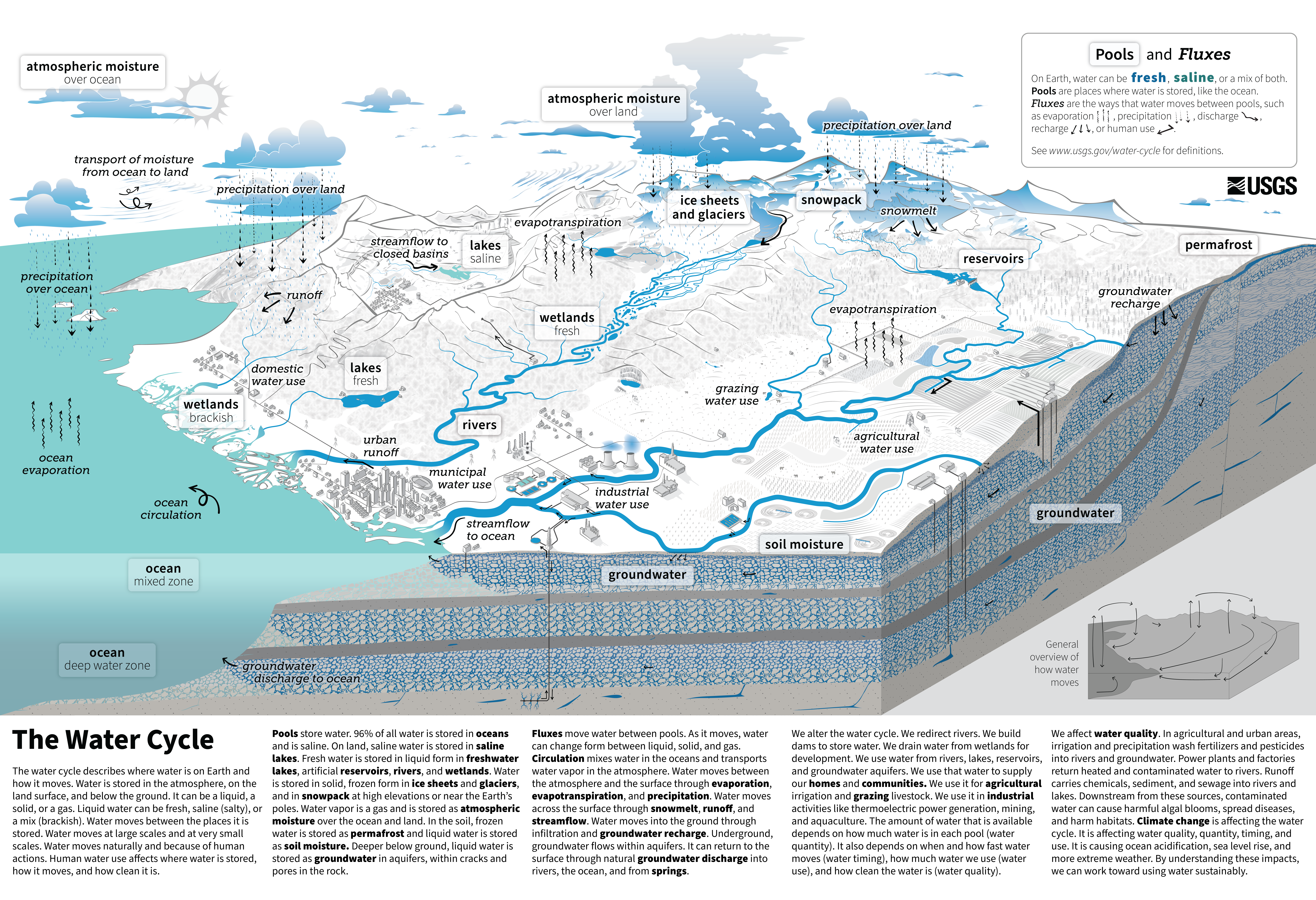
A detailed diagram depicting the global water cycle. The direction of movement of water between reservoirs tends towards upwards movement through evapotranspiration and downward movement through gravity. The diagram also shows how human water use impacts where water is stored and how it moves.

The water cycle (or hydrologic cycle or hydrological cycle) is a biogeochemical cycle that involves the continuous movement of water on, above and below the surface of the Earth across different reservoirs. The mass of water on Earth remains fairly constant over time. However, the partitioning of the water into the major reservoirs of ice, fresh water, salt water and atmospheric water is variable and depends on climatic variables. The water moves from one reservoir to another, such as from river to ocean, or from the ocean to the atmosphere due to a variety of physical and chemical processes. The processes that drive these movements, or fluxes, are evaporation, transpiration, condensation, precipitation, sublimation, infiltration, surface runoff, and subsurface flow. In doing so, the water goes through different phases: liquid, solid (ice) and vapor. The ocean plays a key role in the water cycle as it is the source of 86% of global evaporation.

The water cycle is driven by energy exchanges in the form of heat transfers between different phases. The energy released or absorbed during a phase change can result in temperature changes. Heat is absorbed as water transitions from the liquid to the vapor phase through evaporation. This heat is also known as the latent heat of vaporization. Conversely, when water condenses or melts from solid ice it releases energy and heat. On a global scale, water plays a critical role in transferring heat from the tropics to the poles via ocean circulation.

The evaporative phase of the cycle also acts as a purification process by separating water molecules from salts and other particles that are present in its liquid phase. The condensation phase in the atmosphere replenishes the land with freshwater. The flow of liquid water transports minerals across the globe. It also reshapes the geological features of the Earth, through processes of weathering, erosion, and deposition. The water cycle is also essential for the maintenance of most life and ecosystems on the planet.

Human actions are greatly affecting the water cycle. Activities such as deforestation, urbanization, and the extraction of groundwater are altering natural landscapes (land use changes) all have an effect on the water cycle. On top of this, climate change is leading to an intensification of the water cycle. Research has shown that global warming is causing shifts in precipitation patterns, increased frequency of extreme weather events, and changes in the timing and intensity of rainfall. These water cycle changes affect ecosystems, water availability, agriculture, and human societies.

== Surface runoff ==
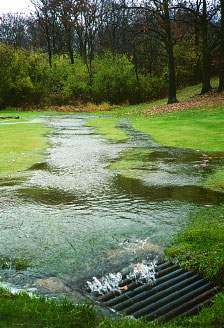
Runoff flowing into a stormwater drain

Surface runoff (also known as overland flow or terrestrial runoff) is the unconfined flow of water over the ground surface, in contrast to channel runoff (or stream flow). It occurs when excess rainwater, stormwater, meltwater, or other sources, can no longer sufficiently rapidly infiltrate in the soil. This can occur when the soil is saturated by water to its full capacity, and the rain arrives more quickly than the soil can absorb it. Surface runoff often occurs because impervious areas (such as roofs and pavement) do not allow water to soak into the ground. Furthermore, runoff can occur either through natural or human-made processes.

Surface runoff is a major component of the water cycle. It is the primary agent of soil erosion by water. The land area producing runoff that drains to a common point is called a drainage basin.

Runoff that occurs on the ground surface before reaching a channel can be a nonpoint source of pollution, as it can carry human-made contaminants or natural forms of pollution (such as rotting leaves). Human-made contaminants in runoff include petroleum, pesticides, fertilizers and others. Much agricultural pollution is exacerbated by surface runoff, leading to a number of down stream impacts, including nutrient pollution that causes eutrophication.

In addition to causing water erosion and pollution, surface runoff in urban areas is a primary cause of urban flooding, which can result in property damage, damp and mold in basements, and street flooding.

=== Urban runoff ===
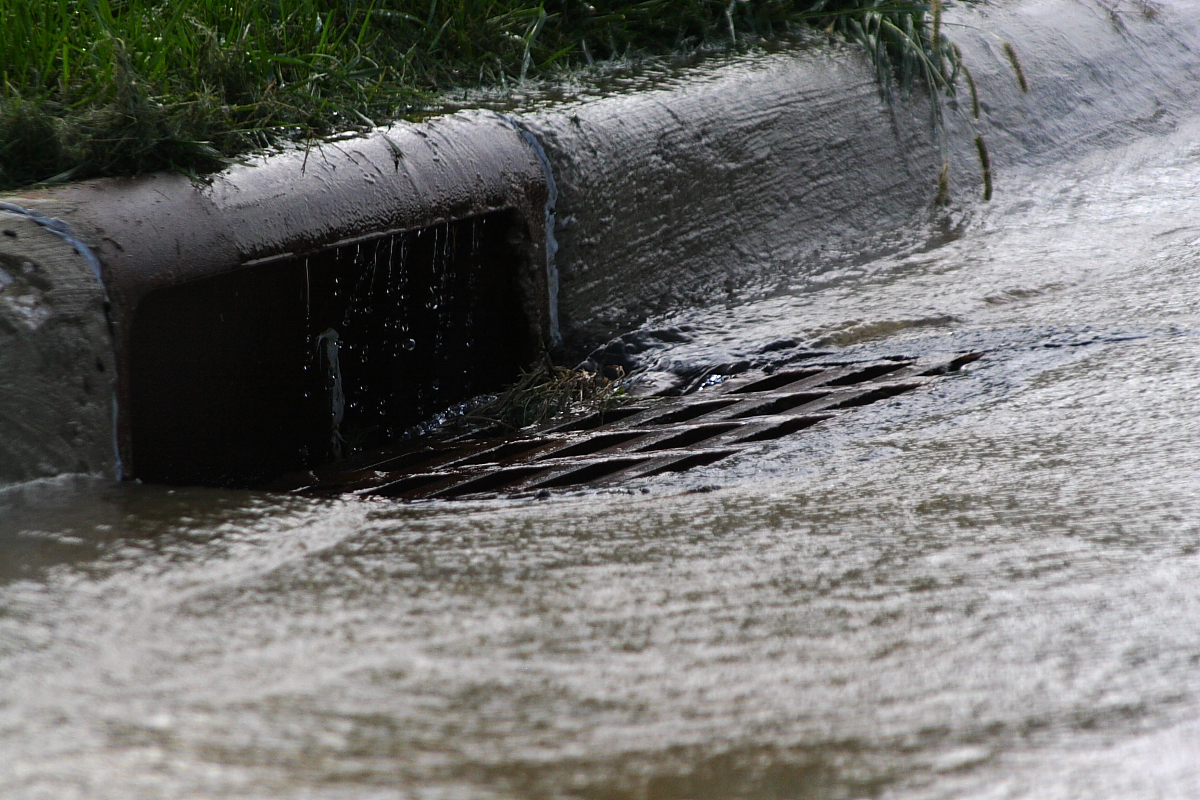
Urban runoff flowing into a storm drain

Urban runoff is surface runoff of rainwater, landscape irrigation, and car washing created by urbanization. Impervious surfaces (roads, parking lots and sidewalks) are constructed during land development. During rain, storms, and other precipitation events, these surfaces (built from materials such as asphalt and concrete), along with rooftops, carry polluted stormwater to storm drains, instead of allowing the water to percolate through soil.

This causes lowering of the water table (because groundwater recharge is lessened) and flooding since the amount of water that remains on the surface is greater. Most municipal storm sewer systems discharge untreated stormwater to streams, rivers, and bays. This excess water can also make its way into people's properties through basement backups and seepage through building wall and floors.

Urban runoff can be a major source of urban flooding and water pollution in urban communities worldwide.

== Channel runoff ==
Streamflow, or channel runoff, is the flow of water in streams and other channels, and is a major element of the water cycle. It is one runoff component, the movement of water from the land to waterbodies, the other component being surface runoff. Water flowing in channels comes from surface runoff from adjacent hillslopes, from groundwater flow out of the ground, and from water discharged from pipes. The discharge of water flowing in a channel is measured using stream gauges or can be estimated by the Manning equation. The record of flow over time is called a hydrograph. Flooding occurs when the volume of water exceeds the capacity of the channel.

== Model ==
A runoff models or rainfall-runoff model describes how rainfall is converted into runoff in a drainage basin (catchment area or watershed). More precisely, it produces a surface runoff hydrograph in response to a rainfall event, represented by and input as a hyetograph. Rainfall-runoff models need to be calibrated before they can be used.

A well known runoff model is the linear reservoir, but in practice it has limited applicability.

The runoff model with a non-linear reservoir is more universally applicable, but still it holds only for catchments whose surface area is limited by the condition that the rainfall can be considered more or less uniformly distributed over the area. The maximum size of the watershed then depends on the rainfall characteristics of the region. When the study area is too large, it can be divided into sub-catchments and the various runoff hydrographs may be combined using flood routing techniques.

=== Curve number ===
The runoff curve number (also called a curve number or simply CN) is an empirical parameter used in hydrology for predicting direct runoff or infiltration from rainfall excess. The curve number method was developed by the USDA Natural Resources Conservation Service, which was formerly called the Soil Conservation Service or SCS — the number is still popularly known as a "SCS runoff curve number" in the literature. The runoff curve number was developed from an empirical analysis of runoff from small catchments and hillslope plots monitored by the USDA. It is widely used and is an efficient method for determining the approximate amount of direct runoff from a rainfall event in a particular area.
