= Discharge regime =

Long-term annual pattern of a river's discharge

Rhône at Gletsch, Switzerland

Annual hydrograph
| J | F | M | A | M | J | J | A | S | O | N | D |
- Pardé coefficients
- Yearly coefficient: 37.91
- Annual variability: 113.06 %
Grimm coefficients
| J+F | F+M | M+A | A+M | M+J | J+J | J+A | A+S | S+O | O+N | N+D | D+J |
- Grimm coefficients

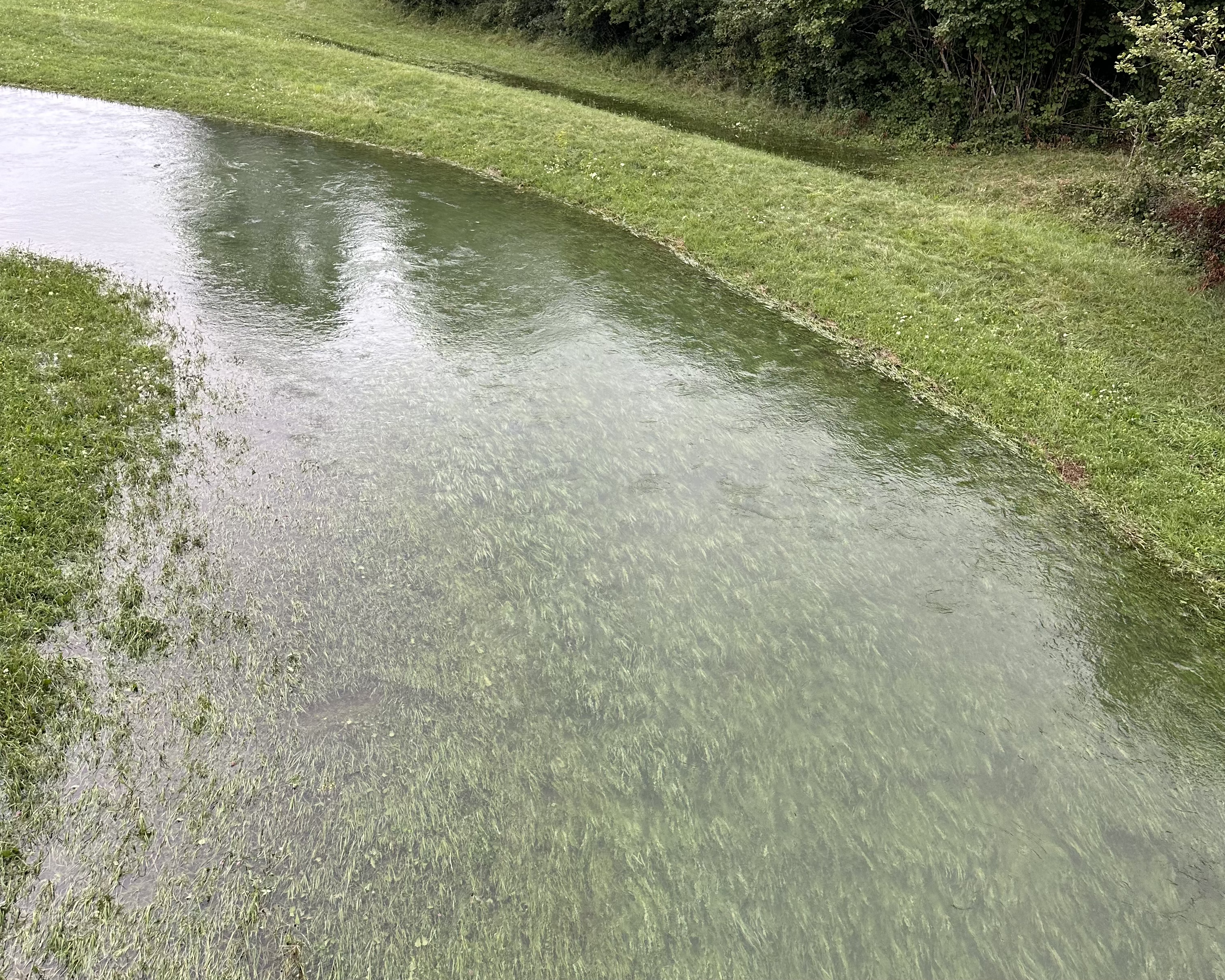
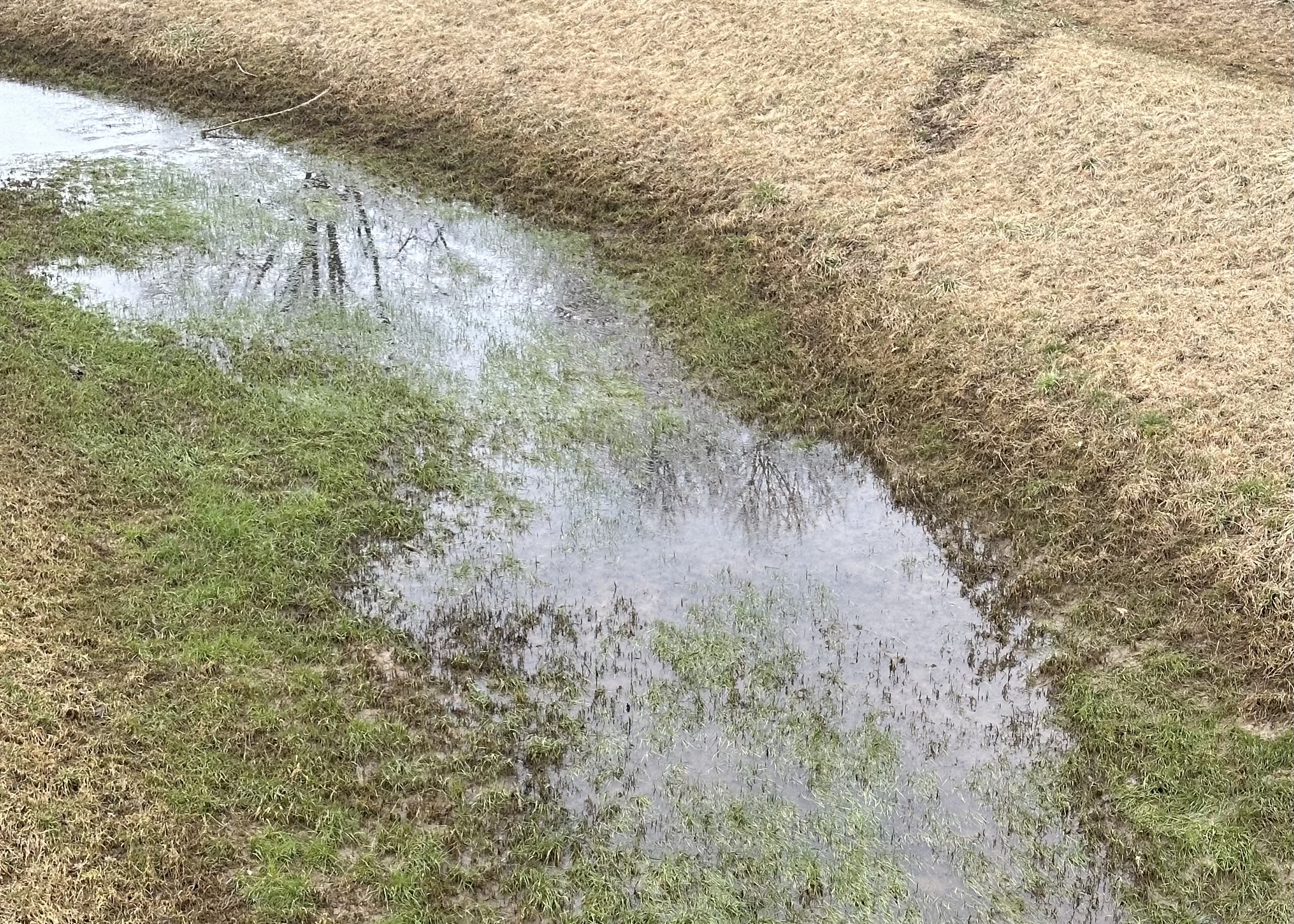

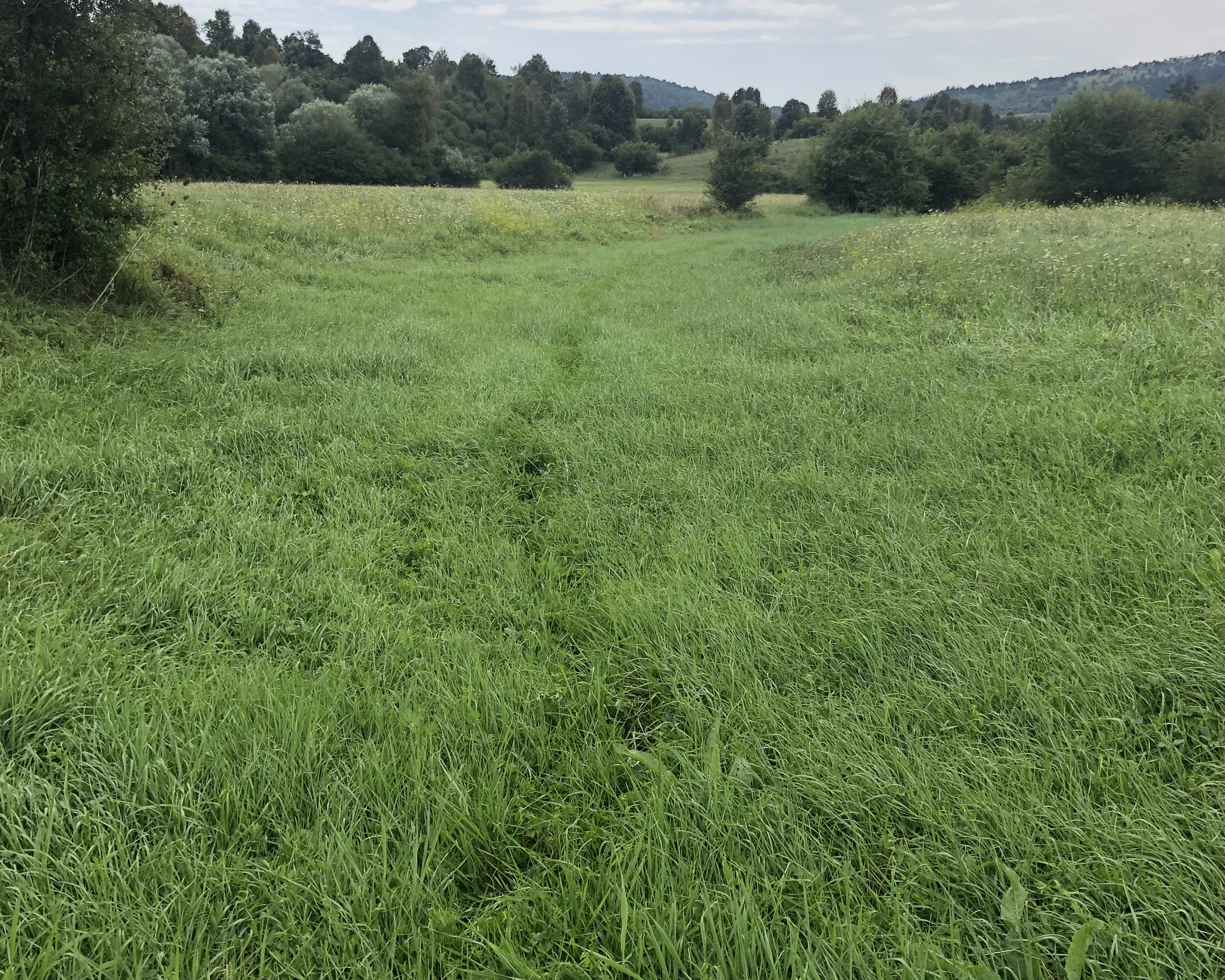
The Pivka River in its upper course near Zagorje at different times of the year. Most of the time it is dry (bottom) but after heavy rainfall in autumn and spring, it becomes full (top), slowly diminishing afterward (middle). Since its discharge is mainly dependent on rainfall, it has a pluvial regime.

Discharge regime, flow regime, or hydrological regime (commonly termed river regime, but that term is also used for other measurements) is the long-term pattern of annual changes to a stream's discharge at a particular point. Hence, it shows how the discharge of a stream at that point is expected to change over the year. It is thus the hydrological equivalent of climate. The main factor affecting the regime is climate, along with relief, bedrock, soil and vegetation, as well as human activity.

Like general trends can be grouped together into certain named groups, either by what causes them and the part of the year they happen (most classifications) or by the climate in which they most commonly appear (Beckinsale classification). There are many different classifications; However, most of them are localized to a specific area and cannot be used to classify all the rivers of the world.

When interpreting such records of discharge, it is important to factor in the timescale over which the average monthly values were calculated. It is particularly difficult to establish a typical annual discharge regime for rivers with high interannual variability in monthly discharge and/or significant changes in the catchment's characteristics (e.g. tectonic influences or the introduction of water management practices).

== Overview ==
Maurice Pardé was the first to classify river regimes more thoroughly. His classification was based on what the primary reasons for such patterns are, and how many of them there are. According to this, he termed three basic types:

- Simple regimes, where there is only one dominant factor.
- Mixed or double regimes, where there are two dominant factors.
- Complex regimes, where there are multiple dominant factors.

Pardé split the simple regimes further into temperature-dependent (glacial, mountains snow melt, plains snow melt; latter two often called "nival") and rainfall-dependent or pluvial (equatorial, intertropical, temperate oceanic, mediterranean) categories.

Beckinsale later more clearly defined the distinct simple regimes based on climate present in the catchment area and thus splitting the world into "hydrological regions". His main inspiration was the Köppen climate classification, and he also devised strings of letters to define them. However, the system was criticised as it based the regimes on climate instead of purely on discharge pattern and also lacked some patterns.

Another attempt to provide classification of world regimes was made in 1988 by Haines et al., which was based purely on the discharge pattern and classified all patterns into one of 15 categories; however, the determination is sometimes contradictory and quite complex, and the distinction does not differentiate between simple, mixed or complex regimes as it determines the regime solely on the main peak, which is contradictory to commonly used system in the Alpine region. Hence, rivers with nivo-pluvial regimes are commonly split into two different categories, while most pluvio-nival regimes are all grouped into a single category along with complex regimes – the uniform regime, despite showing quite pronounced and regular yearly pattern. Moreover, it does not differentiate between temperature-dependant and rainfall-dependant regimes. Nonetheless, it added one new regime that was not present in Beckinsale's classification, the moderate mid-autumn regime with a peak in November (Northern Hemisphere) or May (Southern Hemisphere). This system too, is very rarely used.

The four different river regimes according to Pardé (1955)

In later years, most of the research was only done in the region around the Alps, so that area is much more thoroughly researched than others, and most names for subclasses of regimes are for those found there. These were mostly further differentiated from Pardé's distinction. The most common names given, although they might be defined differently in different publications, are:

- Glacial, for regimes where most of water is due to melting of snow and ice and the peak occurs in late summer.
- Nival, with a peak in late spring or early summer and still high importance of snow-melt.
- Pluvial, which is (almost) purely based on seasonal rainfall and not on snow. A peak is usually in winter, although it can occur at any point along the year. If it occurs in the time of monsoons, it is sometimes called tropical pluvial.
- Nivo-pluvial, with a nival peak in late spring and a pluvial peak in the fall. The main minimum is in winter.
- Pluvio-nival, which is similar to nivo-pluvial, but the nival peak is earlier (March/April on the Northern Hemisphere) and the main minimum is in summer, not in winter.
- Nivo-glacial, for regimes sharing characteristics of glacial and nival regimes and a peak in mid summer.

Pardé's differentiation of single regimes from mixed regimes is sometimes rather considered to be based on the number of peaks rather than the number of factors as it is more objective. Most of nival and even glacial regimes have some influence of rainfall and regimes considered pluvial have some influence of snowfall in regions with continental climate; see the coefficient of nivosity. The distinction between both classifications can be seen with the nivo-glacial regime, which is sometimes considered as a mixed regime, but is often considered as a simple regime in more detailed studies. However, many groupings of multiple pluvial or nival peaks are still considered a simple regime in some sources.

== Measurement of river regimes ==
River regimes, similarly to the climate, are compounded by averaging the discharge data for several years; ideally that should be 30 years or more, as with the climate. However, the data is much scarcer, and sometimes data for as low as eight years are used. If the flow is regular and shows very similar year-to-year pattern, that could be enough, but for rivers with irregular patterns or for those that are most of the time dry, that period has to be much longer for accurate results. This is especially the problem with wadis as they often have both traits. The discharge pattern is specific not only to a river, but also a point along a river as it can change with new tributaries and an increase in the catchment area.

This data is then averaged for each month separately. Sometimes, the average maximum and minimum for each month is also added. But unlike climate, rivers can drastically range in discharge, from small creeks with mean discharges less than 0.1 cubic meters per second to the Amazon River, which has average monthly discharge of more than 200,000 cubic meters per second at its peak in May. For regimes, the exact discharge of a river in one month is not as important as is the relation to other monthly discharges measured at the same point along a particular river. And although discharge is still often used for showing seasonal variation, two other forms are more commonly used, the percentage of yearly flow and the Pardé coefficient.

Percentage of yearly flow represents how much of the total yearly discharge the month contributes and is calculated by the following formula:

$percentage_i = {Q_{i}\over 12 \times {Q_{mean}}} \times 100%$,

where $Q_{i}$ is the mean discharge of a particular month and $Q_{mean}$ is the mean yearly discharge. Discharge of an average month is $100/12 \approx 8.33%$ and the total of all months should add to 100% (or rather, roughly, due to rounding).

Even more common is the Pardé coefficient, discharge coefficient or simply the coefficient, which is more intuitive as an average month would have a value of 1. Anything above that means there is bigger discharge than average and anything lower means that there is lower discharge than the average. It is calculated by the following equation:

$PK_i = {Q_{i}\over{Q_{mean}}}$,

where $Q_{i}$ is the mean discharge of a particular month and $Q_{mean}$ is the mean yearly discharge. Pardé coefficients for all months should add to 12 and are without a unit.

The data is often presented is a special diagram, called a hydrograph, or, more specifically, an annual hydrograph as it shows monthly discharge variation in a year, but no rainfall pattern. The units used in a hydrograph can be either discharge, monthly percentage or Pardé coefficients. The shape of the graph is the same in any case, only the scale needs to be adjusted. From the hydrograph, maxima and minima are easy to spot and the regime can be determined more easily. Hence, they are a vital part for river regimes, just as climographs are for climate.

=== Yearly coefficient ===
Similarly to Pardé's coefficient, there are also other coefficients that can be used to analyze the regime of a river. One possibility is to look how many times the discharge during the peak is larger than the discharge during the minimum, rather than the mean as with Pardé's coefficient. It is sometimes called the yearly coefficient and is defined as:

$K_{year} = {Q_{i_{max}}\over{Q_{i_{min}}}}, {Q_{i_{min}}} \neq 0$,

where $Q_{i_{max}}$ is the mean discharge of the month with the highest discharge and $Q_{i_{min}}$ is the mean discharge of the month with the lowest discharge. If $Q_{i_{min}}$ is 0, then the coefficient is undefined.

=== Annual variability ===
Annual variability shows how much the peaks on average deviate from the perfectly uniform regime. It is calculated as the standard deviation of the mean discharge of months from the mean yearly discharge. That value is then divided by the mean yearly discharge and multiplied by 100%, i.e.:

$C_v^* = {\sqrt {{\sum_{i=1}^{12}(Q_i-Q_{mean})^2} \over 12} \over Q_{mean}} \times 100%$

The most uniform regimes have a value below 10%, while it can reach more than 150% for rivers with the most drastic peaks.

=== Grimm coefficients ===
Grimm coefficients, used in Austria, are not defined for a single month, but for 'doppelmonats', i.e., for two consecutive months. The mean flow of both months – January and February, February and March, March and April, and so on – is added, still conserving 12 different values throughout the year. This is done since for nival regimes, this better correlates to different types of peak (nival, nivo-glacial, glacial etc.). They are defined as follows:

$SK_{doppelmonat} = {Q_{doppelmonat}\over{Q_{mean}}}$ (Initial definition)

$SK_{doppelmonat} = {Q_{doppelmonat}\over{2 \times Q_{mean}}}$ (Adapted definition so values are closer to Pardé's; version used on Wikipedia)

$SK_{year} = {Q_{{doppelmonat}_{max}}\over{Q_{{doppelmonat}_{min}}}}, {Q_{{doppelmonat}_{min}}} \neq 0$,

where $Q_{doppelmonat} = Q_i + Q_{i+1}$.

=== Coefficient of nivosity ===
Pardé and Beckinsale determined whether the peak is pluvio-nival, nivo-pluvial, nival or glacial based on the fact what percentage of the discharge during the warm season is contributed by the melt-water, and not by the time of the peak as it is common today. However, it has been calculated for few rivers. The values are the following:

- 0–6%: pluvial
- 6–14%: pluvio-nival
- 15–25%: nivo-pluvial
- 26–38%: transition to nival
- 39–50%: pure nival to nivo-glacial
- more than 50%: glacial

== Factors affecting river regimes ==
There are multiple factors that determine when a river will have a greater discharge and when a smaller one. The most obvious factor is precipitation, since most rivers get their water supply in that way. However, temperature also plays a significant role, as well as the characteristics of its catchment area, such as altitude, vegetation, bedrock, soil and lake storage. An important factor is also the human factor as humans may either fully control the water supply by building dams and barriers, or partially by diverting water for irrigation, industrial and personal use. The factor that differentiates classification of river regimes from climate the most is that rivers can change their regime along its path due to a change of conditions and new tributaries.

=== Climate ===
The primary factor affecting river regimes is the climate of its catchment area, both by the amount of rainfall and by the temperature fluctuations throughout the year. This has led Beckinsale to classify regimes based primarily on the climate. Although there is correlation, climate is still not fully reflected in a river regime. Moreover, a catchment area can span through more than one climate and lead to more complex interactions between the climate and the regime.

A discharge pattern can closely resemble the rainfall pattern since rainfall in a river's catchment area contributes to its water flow, rise of the underground water and filling of lakes. There is some delay between the peak rainfall and peak discharge, which is also dependent on the type of soil and bedrock, since the water from rain must reach the gauging station for the discharge to be recorded. The time is naturally longer for bigger catchment areas.

If the water from precipitation is frozen, such as snow or hail, it has to melt first, leading to longer delays and shallower peaks. The delay becomes heavily influenced by the temperature since temperatures below zero cause the snow to stay frozen until it becomes warmer in the spring, when temperatures rise and melt the snow, leading to a peak, which might be again a bit delayed. The time of the peak is determined by when the midday temperature sufficiently soars above 0 °C (32 °F), which is usually considered to be when the average temperature reaches above −3 °C (27 °F). In the mildest continental climates, bordering the oceanic climate, the peak is usually in March on the Northern Hemisphere or September on the Southern Hemisphere, but can be as late as August/February on the highest mountains and ice caps, where the flow also heavily varies throughout the day.

Melting of glaciers alone can also supply large amounts of water even in areas where there is little to no precipitation, as in ice cap climate and cold dry and semi-dry climates.

On the other side, high temperatures and sunny weather lead to a significant increase in evapotranspiration, either directly from river, or from moist soil and plants, leading to the fact that less precipitation reaches the river and that plants consume more water, respectively. For terrain in darker colors, the rate of evaporation is higher than for a terrain in lighter colors due to lower albedo.

=== Relief ===
Relief often determines how sharp and how wide the nival peaks are, leading Pardé to already classify mountain nival and plain nival regimes separately. If the relief is rather flat, the snow will melt everywhere in a short period of time due to similar conditions, leading to a sharp peak about three months wide. However, if the terrain is hilly or mountainous, snow located in lowlands will melt first, with the temperature gradually decreasing with altitude (about 6 °C (43 °F) per 1000 m). Hence the peak is wider, and especially the decrease after the peak can extend all the way to late summer when the temperatures are highest. Due to this phenomenon, the precipitation in lowland areas might be rainfall, but snow in higher areas, leading to a peak quickly after the rainfall and another when the temperatures start to melt the snow.

Another important aspect is altitude. At exceptionally high altitudes, atmosphere is thinner so the solar insolation is much greater, which is why Beckinsale differentiates between mountain nival and glacial from similar regimes found at higher latitudes.

Additionally, steeper slopes lead to faster surface runoff, leading to more prominent peaks, while flat terrain allows for lakes to spread, which regulate the discharge of the river downstream. Larger catchment areas also lead to shallower peaks.

Near the spring

Before Lake Geneva

Rhône at Porte du Scex, Switzerland

Annual hydrograph
| J | F | M | A | M | J | J | A | S | O | N | D |
- Pardé coefficients
- Yearly coefficient: 4.26
- Annual variability: 58.305 %
Grimm coefficients
| J+F | F+M | M+A | A+M | M+J | J+J | J+A | A+S | S+O | O+N | N+D | D+J |
- Grimm coefficients

After Lake Geneva

Rhône at Chancy, Aux Ripes, Switzerland

Annual hydrograph
| J | F | M | A | M | J | J | A | S | O | N | D |
- Pardé coefficients
- Yearly coefficient: 2.18
- Annual variability: 30.807 %
Grimm coefficients
| J+F | F+M | M+A | A+M | M+J | J+J | J+A | A+S | S+O | O+N | N+D | D+J |
- Grimm coefficients

=== Vegetation ===
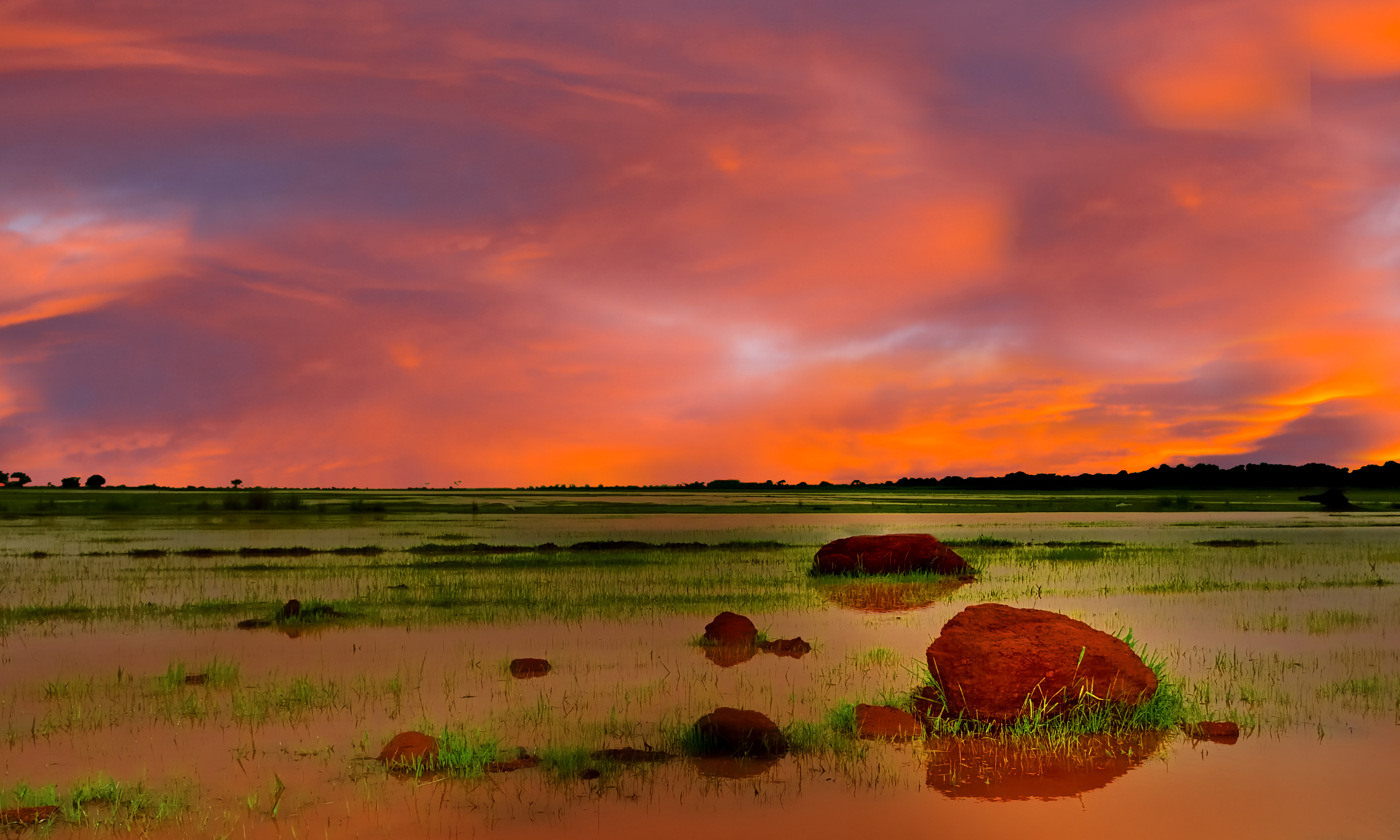
Bahr el Ghazal River, notorious for having a lot of vegetation growing in the stream.

Vegetation in general decreases surface runoff and consequently discharge of a river, and leads to greater infiltration. Forests dominated by trees that shed their leaves during winter have an annual pattern of the extent of water interception, which shapes the pattern in its own way. The impact of vegetation is noticeable in all areas but the driest and coldest, where vegetation is scarce. Vegetation growing in the river beds can drastically hinder the flow of water, especially in the summer, leading to smaller discharges.

=== Soil and bedrock ===
The most important aspect of the ground in this regard is the permeability and water-holding capacity of the rocks and soils in the discharge basin. In general, the more the ground is permeable, the less pronounced the maxima and minima are since the rocks accumulate water during the wet season and release it during the dry season; lag time is also longer since there is less surface runoff. If the wet season is really pronounced, the rocks become saturated and fail to infiltrate excess water, so all rainfall is quickly released into the stream. On the other side, however, if the rocks are too permeable, as in the karst terrain, rivers might have a notable discharge only when the rocks are saturated or the groundwater level rises and would otherwise be dry with all the water accumulating in subterranean rivers or disappearing in ponors. Examples of rocks with high water-holding capacity include limestone, sandstone and basalt, while materials used in urban areas (such as asphalt and concrete) have very low permeability leading to flash floods.

=== Human activity ===
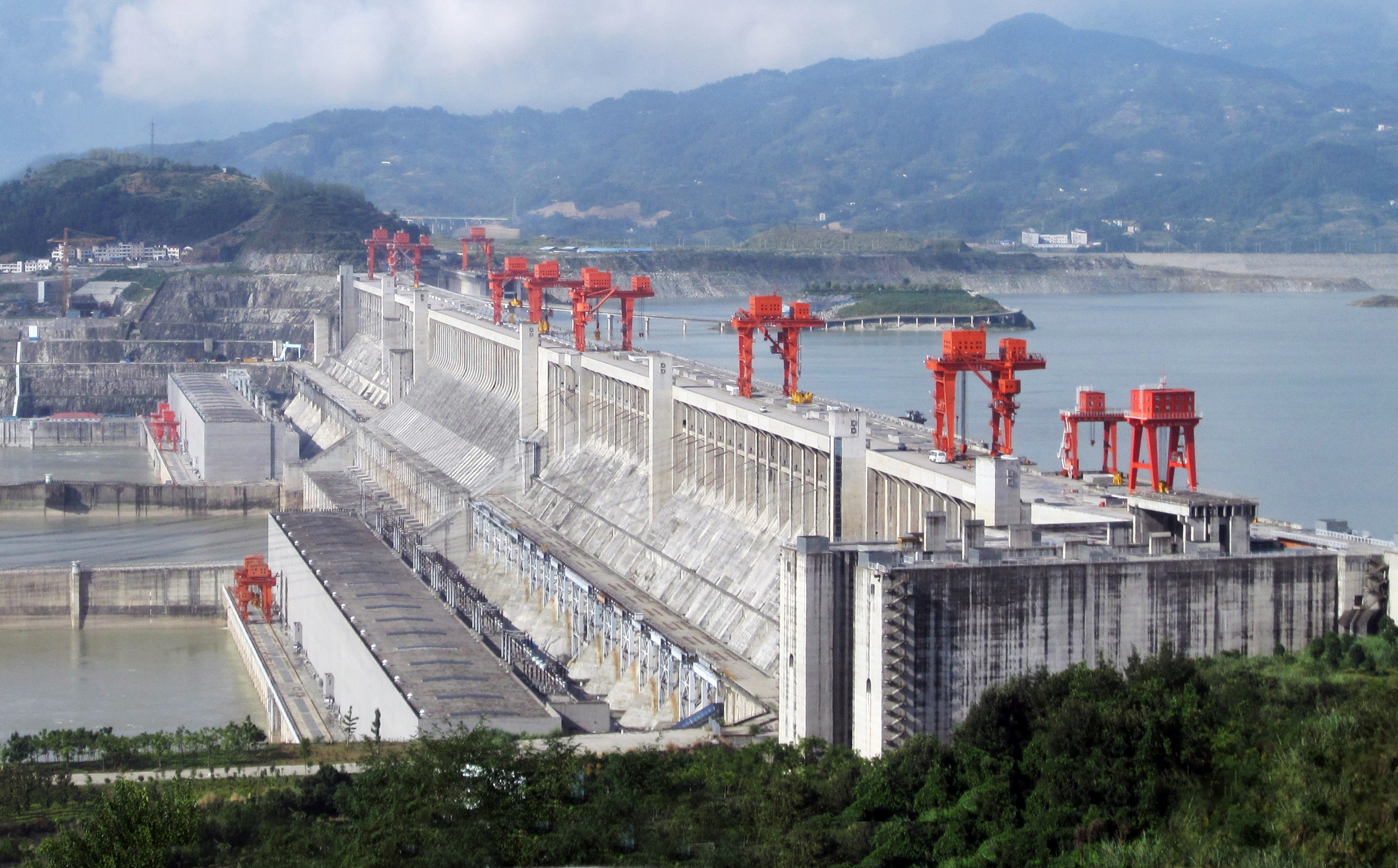
Three Gorges Dam, the largest power station in the world.

Human factors can also greatly change discharge of a river. On one side, water can be extracted either directly from a river or indirectly from groundwater for the purposes of drinking and irrigation, among others, lowering the discharge. For the latter, the consumption usually spikes during the dry season or during crop growth (i.e., summer and spring). On the other side, waste waters are released into streams, increasing the discharge; however, they are more or less constant all year round so they do not impact the regime as much.

Another important factor is the construction of dams, where a lot of water accumulates in a lake, making the minima and maxima less pronounced. In addition, the discharge of water is often in large part regulated in regard to other human needs, such as electricity production, meaning that the discharge of a river downstream of a dam can be completely different than upstream.

Here, an example is given for the Aswan Dam. As can be observed, the yearly coefficient is lower at the dam than upstream, showing the effect of the dam.

Before the dam

Nile River at Dongola, Sudan

Annual hydrograph
| J | F | M | A | M | J | J | A | S | O | N | D |
- Pardé coefficients
- Yearly coefficient: 9.54
- Annual variability: 92.309 %
Grimm coefficients
| J+F | F+M | M+A | A+M | M+J | J+J | J+A | A+S | S+O | O+N | N+D | D+J |
- Grimm coefficients

At the dam

Nile River at Aswan Dam, Egypt

Annual hydrograph
| J | F | M | A | M | J | J | A | S | O | N | D |
- Pardé coefficients
- Yearly coefficient: 8.16
- Annual variability: 81.957 %
Grimm coefficients
| J+F | F+M | M+A | A+M | M+J | J+J | J+A | A+S | S+O | O+N | N+D | D+J |
- Grimm coefficients

== Simple regimes ==
Simple regimes are hence only those that have exactly one peak; this does not hold for cases where both peaks are nival or both are pluvial, which are often grouped together into simple regimes. They are grouped into five categories: pluvial, tropical pluvial, nival, nivo-glacial and glacial.

=== Pluvial regime ===
Pluvial regimes occur mainly in oceanic and mediterranean climates, such as the UK, New Zealand, southeastern USA, South Africa and the Mediterranean regions. Generally, peaks occur in colder season, from November to May on the Northern Hemisphere (although April and May occur in a small area near Texas) and from June to September on the Southern Hemisphere. Pardé had two different types for this category – the temperate pluvial and the Mediterranean regimes. The peak is due to rainfall in the colder period and the minimum is in summer due to higher evapotranspiration and usually less rainfall.

The temperate pluvial regime (Beckinsale symbol CFa/b) usually has a milder minimum and the discharge is quite high also during the summer.

Temperate pluvial regime
Northern Hemisphere

Karup A at Hagebro, Denmark

Annual hydrograph
| J | F | M | A | M | J | J | A | S | O | N | D |
- Pardé coefficients
- Yearly coefficient: 1.55
- Annual variability: 15.842 %
Grimm coefficients
| J+F | F+M | M+A | A+M | M+J | J+J | J+A | A+S | S+O | O+N | N+D | D+J |
- Grimm coefficients

Southern Hemisphere

Tarawera River at Awakaponga, New Zealand

Annual hydrograph
| J | F | M | A | M | J | J | A | S | O | N | D |
- Pardé coefficients
- Yearly coefficient: 1.22
- Annual variability: 7.438 %
Grimm coefficients
| J+F | F+M | M+A | A+M | M+J | J+J | J+A | A+S | S+O | O+N | N+D | D+J |
- Grimm coefficients

Meanwhile, the Mediterranean regime (Beckinsale symbol CS) has a more pronounced minimum due to a lack of rainfall in the region, and rivers have a noticeably smaller discharge during summer, or even dry up completely.

Mediterranean regime
Northern Hemisphere

Kocasu River at Akcasusurluk, Turkey

Annual hydrograph
| J | F | M | A | M | J | J | A | S | O | N | D |
- Pardé coefficients
- Yearly coefficient: 10.76
- Annual variability: 73.9 %
Grimm coefficients
| J+F | F+M | M+A | A+M | M+J | J+J | J+A | A+S | S+O | O+N | N+D | D+J |
- Grimm coefficients

Southern Hemisphere

Merri River at Woodford, Australia

Annual hydrograph
| J | F | M | A | M | J | J | A | S | O | N | D |
- Pardé coefficients
- Yearly coefficient: 34.3
- Annual variability: 108.517 %
Grimm coefficients
| J+F | F+M | M+A | A+M | M+J | J+J | J+A | A+S | S+O | O+N | N+D | D+J |
- Grimm coefficients

Beckinsale distinguished another pluvial regime, with a peak in April or May, which he denoted CFaT as it occurs almost solely around Texas, Louisiana and Arkansas.

Texan regime
Northern Hemisphere

Buffalo River at Near St. Joe, AR, USA

Annual hydrograph
| J | F | M | A | M | J | J | A | S | O | N | D |
- Pardé coefficients
- Yearly coefficient: 13.13
- Annual variability: 67.536 %
Grimm coefficients
| J+F | F+M | M+A | A+M | M+J | J+J | J+A | A+S | S+O | O+N | N+D | D+J |
- Grimm coefficients

Southern Hemisphere

Whanganui River at Te Porere, New Zealand

Annual hydrograph
| J | F | M | A | M | J | J | A | S | O | N | D |
- Pardé coefficients
- Yearly coefficient: 1.48
- Annual variability: 12.807 %
Grimm coefficients
| J+F | F+M | M+A | A+M | M+J | J+J | J+A | A+S | S+O | O+N | N+D | D+J |
- Grimm coefficients

=== Tropical pluvial regime ===
The name for the regime is misleading; the regime commonly occurs anywhere the main rainfall is during summer. This includes the intertropical region, but also includes parts influenced by monsoon, extending north even to Russia and south to central Argentina. It is characterized by a strong peak during the warm period, with a maximum from May to December on the Northern Hemisphere and from January to June on the Southern Hemisphere. The regime therefore allows for a lot of variation, both in terms of when the peak occurs and how low the minimum is.

Pardé additionally differentiated this category into two subtypes and Beckinsale split it into four. The most common such regime is Beckinsale's regime AM (for monsoon, as in Köppen classification), which is characterized by a period of low discharge for up to four months. It occurs in western Africa, the Amazon basin, and southeastern Asia.

Monsoonal tropical pluvial regime
Northern Hemisphere

Wu River at Gongtan, PRC

Annual hydrograph
| J | F | M | A | M | J | J | A | S | O | N | D |
- Pardé coefficients
- Yearly coefficient: 8.2
- Annual variability: 65.148 %
Grimm coefficients
| J+F | F+M | M+A | A+M | M+J | J+J | J+A | A+S | S+O | O+N | N+D | D+J |
- Grimm coefficients

Southern Hemisphere

Zambezi at Kaleni Hill Road Bridge, Zambia

Annual hydrograph
| J | F | M | A | M | J | J | A | S | O | N | D |
- Pardé coefficients
- Yearly coefficient: 2.75
- Annual variability: 34.755 %
Grimm coefficients
| J+F | F+M | M+A | A+M | M+J | J+J | J+A | A+S | S+O | O+N | N+D | D+J |
- Grimm coefficients

In more arid areas, the period of low water increases to six, seven months and up to nine, which Beckinsale classified as AW. The peak is hence narrower and greater.

Tropical pluvial with long low water regime
Northern Hemisphere

Gorouol at Koriziena, Burkina Faso

Annual hydrograph
| J | F | M | A | M | J | J | A | S | O | N | D |
- Pardé coefficients
- Yearly coefficient: undefined
- Annual variability: 189.781 %
Grimm coefficients
| J+F | F+M | M+A | A+M | M+J | J+J | J+A | A+S | S+O | O+N | N+D | D+J |
- Grimm coefficients

Southern Hemisphere

Archer River at Telegraph Crossing, Australia

Annual hydrograph
| J | F | M | A | M | J | J | A | S | O | N | D |
- Pardé coefficients
- Yearly coefficient: 324.74
- Annual variability: 138.9 %
Grimm coefficients
| J+F | F+M | M+A | A+M | M+J | J+J | J+A | A+S | S+O | O+N | N+D | D+J |
- Grimm coefficients

In dry climate, ephemeral streams that have irregular year-to-year patterns exist. Most of the time, it is dry and it only has discharge during flash floods. Beckinsale classifies it as BW, but only briefly mentions. Due to irregularity, the peak might be spread out or show multiple peaks, and could resemble other regimes.

Dry tropical regime
Northern Hemisphere

Wadi Ibra at Ibra, Oman

Annual hydrograph
| J | F | M | A | M | J | J | A | S | O | N | D |
- Pardé coefficients
- Yearly coefficient: 130.41
- Annual variability: 124.215 %
Grimm coefficients
| J+F | F+M | M+A | A+M | M+J | J+J | J+A | A+S | S+O | O+N | N+D | D+J |
- Grimm coefficients

Southern Hemisphere

Swart-Nossob at Henopsrus, Namibia

Annual hydrograph
| J | F | M | A | M | J | J | A | S | O | N | D |
- Pardé coefficients
- Yearly coefficient: undefined
- Annual variability: 104.487 %
Grimm coefficients
| J+F | F+M | M+A | A+M | M+J | J+J | J+A | A+S | S+O | O+N | N+D | D+J |
- Grimm coefficients

The previous three regimes are all called intertropical by Pardé but the next is also differentiated by him as it has two maxima instead of one. He termed the name equatorial regime, while Beckinsale used the symbol AF. It occurs in Africa around Cameroon and Gabon, and in Asia in Indonesia and Malaysia, where one peak is in October/November/December and another in April/May/June, sort of being symmetrical for both hemispheres. Interestingly, the same pattern is not observed in South America.

Equatorial regime
Northern Hemisphere

Ntem River at Ngoazik, Cameroon

Annual hydrograph
| J | F | M | A | M | J | J | A | S | O | N | D |
- Pardé coefficients
- Yearly coefficient: 6.63
- Annual variability: 56.856 %
Grimm coefficients
| J+F | F+M | M+A | A+M | M+J | J+J | J+A | A+S | S+O | O+N | N+D | D+J |
- Grimm coefficients

Southern Hemisphere

Ogooué River at Franceville, Gabon

Annual hydrograph
| J | F | M | A | M | J | J | A | S | O | N | D |
- Pardé coefficients
- Yearly coefficient: 2.7
- Annual variability: 30.27 %
Grimm coefficients
| J+F | F+M | M+A | A+M | M+J | J+J | J+A | A+S | S+O | O+N | N+D | D+J |
- Grimm coefficients

=== Nival regime ===
Nival regime is characterized by a maximum which is contributed by the snow-melt as the temperatures increase above the melting point. Hence, the peaks occur in spring or summer. They occur in regions with continental and polar climate, which is on the Southern Hemisphere mostly limited to the Andes, Antarctica and minor outlying islands.

Pardé split the regimes into two groups: the mountain nival and the plain nival regimes, which Beckinsale also expanded. Plain regimes have maxima that are more pronounced and narrow, usually up to three months, and the minimum is milder and mostly not much lower from other months apart from the peak. The minimum, if the regime is not transitioning to a pluvio-nival regime, is usually quickly after the maximum, while for mountain regimes, it is often right before. Such regimes are exceptionally rare on the Southern Hemisphere.

Nival regimes are commonly intermittent in subarctic climate where the river freezes during winter.

==== Plain nival regime ====
Beckinsale differentiates six plain nival to nivo-pluvial regimes, mainly based on when the peak occurs. If the peak occurs in March or April, Beckinsale called this a DFa/b regime, which correlates to Mader's transitional pluvial regime. There, it is defined more precisely that the peak is in March or April, with the second highest discharge in the other of those months, not February or May. This translates to a peak in September or October on the southern hemisphere. This regime occurs in most European plains and parts of St. Lawrence River basin.

Plain transitional pluvial regime
Northern Hemisphere

Nottawasaga River at Near Baxter, Canada

Annual hydrograph
| J | F | M | A | M | J | J | A | S | O | N | D |
- Pardé coefficients
- Yearly coefficient: 6.49
- Annual variability: 65.236 %
Grimm coefficients
| J+F | F+M | M+A | A+M | M+J | J+J | J+A | A+S | S+O | O+N | N+D | D+J |
- Grimm coefficients

If the nivo-pluvial peak occurs later, in April or May (October or November on the Southern Hemisphere), followed by the discharge of the other month, the regime is transitional nival or DFb/c. This regime is rarer and occurs mostly in parts of Russia and Canada, but also at some plains at higher altitudes.

Plain transitional nival regime
Northern Hemisphere

Qalghutti at Enbek, Kazakhstan

Annual hydrograph
| J | F | M | A | M | J | J | A | S | O | N | D |
- Pardé coefficients
- Yearly coefficient: 9.96
- Annual variability: 94.111 %
Grimm coefficients
| J+F | F+M | M+A | A+M | M+J | J+J | J+A | A+S | S+O | O+N | N+D | D+J |
- Grimm coefficients

In parts of Russia and Canada and on elevated plains, the peak can be even later, in May or June (November or December on the Southern Hemisphere). Beckinsale denoted this regime with DFc.

Violent nival spring maximum regime
Northern Hemisphere

Bruneau River at Near Hot Spring, ID, United States

Annual hydrograph
| J | F | M | A | M | J | J | A | S | O | N | D |
- Pardé coefficients
- Yearly coefficient: 17.01
- Annual variability: 101.087 %
Grimm coefficients
| J+F | F+M | M+A | A+M | M+J | J+J | J+A | A+S | S+O | O+N | N+D | D+J |
- Grimm coefficients

Beckinsale also added another category, Dwd, for rivers that completely diminish during the winter due to cold conditions with a sharp maximum in the summer. Such rivers occur in Siberia and northern Canada. The peak can be from May to July on Northern Hemisphere or from November to January on Southern Hemisphere.

Prolonged cold season minimum regime
Northern Hemisphere

Ebitiyem at Ebetem, Russia

Annual hydrograph
| J | F | M | A | M | J | J | A | S | O | N | D |
- Pardé coefficients
- Yearly coefficient: undefined
- Annual variability: 167.228 %
Grimm coefficients
| J+F | F+M | M+A | A+M | M+J | J+J | J+A | A+S | S+O | O+N | N+D | D+J |
- Grimm coefficients

Apart from that, he also added another category for regimes with pluvio-nival or nivo-pluvial maxima where the pluvial maximum corresponds to a Texan or early tropical pluvial regime, not the usual temperate pluvial. This regime occurs in parts of PRC and around Kansas.

Winter nival minimum
Northern Hemisphere

Republican River at Clay Center, KS, USA

Annual hydrograph
| J | F | M | A | M | J | J | A | S | O | N | D |
- Pardé coefficients
- Yearly coefficient: 5.16
- Annual variability: 52.128 %
Grimm coefficients
| J+F | F+M | M+A | A+M | M+J | J+J | J+A | A+S | S+O | O+N | N+D | D+J |
- Grimm coefficients

If this peak happens later, Beckinsale classified it as DWb/c. The peak can occur as late as September on the Northern Hemisphere or March on the Southern Hemisphere.

Long winter nival minimum regime
Northern Hemisphere

Songhua River at Jilin, PRC

Annual hydrograph
| J | F | M | A | M | J | J | A | S | O | N | D |
- Pardé coefficients
- Yearly coefficient: 3.32
- Annual variability: 42.613 %
Grimm coefficients
| J+F | F+M | M+A | A+M | M+J | J+J | J+A | A+S | S+O | O+N | N+D | D+J |
- Grimm coefficients

==== Mountain nival regime ====
Pardé and Beckinsale both assigned only one category to the mountain nival regime (symbol HN), but Mader distinguishes several of them. If the peak occurs in April or May on Northern Hemisphere and October or November on Southern Hemisphere with the discharge of the other of those two months following, it is called transitional nival, common for lower hilly areas.

Mountain transitional nival regime
Northern Hemisphere

Großache at Staudach, Germany

Annual hydrograph
| J | F | M | A | M | J | J | A | S | O | N | D |
- Pardé coefficients
- Yearly coefficient: 2.77
- Annual variability: 34.555 %
Grimm coefficients
| J+F | F+M | M+A | A+M | M+J | J+J | J+A | A+S | S+O | O+N | N+D | D+J |
- Grimm coefficients

Southern Hemisphere

Gualjaina River at Gualjaina, Argentina

Annual hydrograph
| J | F | M | A | M | J | J | A | S | O | N | D |
- Pardé coefficients
- Yearly coefficient: 9.1
- Annual variability: 65.599 %
Grimm coefficients
| J+F | F+M | M+A | A+M | M+J | J+J | J+A | A+S | S+O | O+N | N+D | D+J |
- Grimm coefficients

If the peak is in May or June on the Northern Hemisphere, or November or December on Southern Hemisphere, followed by the other of those two, the regime is called mild nival.

Mild nival regime
Northern Hemisphere

Traun at Ebensee, Austria

Annual hydrograph
| J | F | M | A | M | J | J | A | S | O | N | D |
- Pardé coefficients
- Yearly coefficient: 3.71
- Annual variability: 46.23 %
Grimm coefficients
| J+F | F+M | M+A | A+M | M+J | J+J | J+A | A+S | S+O | O+N | N+D | D+J |
- Grimm coefficients

Southern Hemisphere

Colorado River at Pichi Mahuida, Argentina

Annual hydrograph
| J | F | M | A | M | J | J | A | S | O | N | D |
- Pardé coefficients
- Yearly coefficient: 3.52
- Annual variability: 50.292 %
Grimm coefficients
| J+F | F+M | M+A | A+M | M+J | J+J | J+A | A+S | S+O | O+N | N+D | D+J |
- Grimm coefficients

The regime which Mader just calls 'nival' is when the highest discharge is in June/December, followed by July/January, and then May/November.

Mader's nival regime
Northern Hemisphere

Felber Bach at Haidbach, Austria

Annual hydrograph
| J | F | M | A | M | J | J | A | S | O | N | D |
- Pardé coefficients
- Yearly coefficient: 5.33
- Annual variability: 57.193 %
Grimm coefficients
| J+F | F+M | M+A | A+M | M+J | J+J | J+A | A+S | S+O | O+N | N+D | D+J |
- Grimm coefficients

Southern Hemisphere

San Juan River at La Puntilla, Argentina

Annual hydrograph
| J | F | M | A | M | J | J | A | S | O | N | D |
- Pardé coefficients
- Yearly coefficient: 3.27
- Annual variability: 46.426 %
Grimm coefficients
| J+F | F+M | M+A | A+M | M+J | J+J | J+A | A+S | S+O | O+N | N+D | D+J |
- Grimm coefficients

=== Nivo-glacial regime ===
The nivo-glacial regime occurs in areas where seasonal snow meets the permanent ice sheets of glaciers on top of mountains or at higher latitudes. Therefore, both melting of snow and ice from glaciers contribute to produce a maximum in early or mid summer. In turn, it could still be distinguished between plain and mountain regimes, but that distinction is rarely made despite being quite obvious. It is also characterized by great diurnal changes, and a sharp maximum. Pardé and Beckinsale did not distinguish this regime from glacial and nival regimes. Mader defines it as having a peak in June or July, followed by the other of the two, and then the August's discharge, which translates to a peak in December or January, followed by the other two and then February for Southern Hemisphere. Such regimes occur in the Alps, the Himalayas, Coast Mountains and southern Andes.

Mountain nivo-glacial regime
Northern Hemisphere

Lillooet River at Near Pemberton, Canada

Annual hydrograph
| J | F | M | A | M | J | J | A | S | O | N | D |
- Pardé coefficients
- Yearly coefficient: 9.88
- Annual variability: 79.038 %
Grimm coefficients
| J+F | F+M | M+A | A+M | M+J | J+J | J+A | A+S | S+O | O+N | N+D | D+J |
- Grimm coefficients

Plain nivo-glacial regimes occur on Greenland, northern Canada and Svalbard.

Plain nivo-glacial regime
Northern Hemisphere

Zackenberg Bay Tributary at Zackenberg hydrometric station, Greenland

Annual hydrograph
| J | F | M | A | M | J | J | A | S | O | N | D |
- Pardé coefficients
- Yearly coefficient: undefined
- Annual variability: 173.745 %
Grimm coefficients
| J+F | F+M | M+A | A+M | M+J | J+J | J+A | A+S | S+O | O+N | N+D | D+J |
- Grimm coefficients

=== Glacial regime ===
The glacial regime is the most extreme variety of temperature-dependent regimes and occurs in areas where more than 20% of its catchment area is covered by glaciers. This is usually at altitudes over 2,500 m (8,202 ft 1 in), but it can also happen in polar climates which was not explicitly mentioned by Pardé, who grouped both categories together. Rivers with this regime also experience great diurnal variations.

The discharge is heavily dominated by the melting of glaciers, leading to a strong maximum in late summer and a really intense minimum during the rest of the year, unless it has major lake storage, such as the Rhône after the Lake Geneva or the Baker River, which is shown below. Mader defines it to have the highest discharge in July or August, followed by the other month.

Mountain glacial regime
Northern Hemisphere

Rhône at Gletsch, Switzerland

Annual hydrograph
| J | F | M | A | M | J | J | A | S | O | N | D |
- Pardé coefficients
- Yearly coefficient: 37.91
- Annual variability: 113.06 %
Grimm coefficients
| J+F | F+M | M+A | A+M | M+J | J+J | J+A | A+S | S+O | O+N | N+D | D+J |
- Grimm coefficients

Southern Hemisphere

Baker River at Colonia, Chile

Annual hydrograph
| J | F | M | A | M | J | J | A | S | O | N | D |
- Pardé coefficients
- Yearly coefficient: 2.01
- Annual variability: 24.199 %
Grimm coefficients
| J+F | F+M | M+A | A+M | M+J | J+J | J+A | A+S | S+O | O+N | N+D | D+J |
- Grimm coefficients

In really extreme cases (mostly on Antarctica), there could also be a plain glacial regime.

Plain glacial regime
Southern Hmisphere

Onyx River at Lake Vanda, Ross Dependency

Annual hydrograph
| J | F | M | A | M | J | J | A | S | O | N | D |
- Pardé coefficients
- Yearly coefficient: undefined
- Annual variability: 221.937 %
Grimm coefficients
| J+F | F+M | M+A | A+M | M+J | J+J | J+A | A+S | S+O | O+N | N+D | D+J |
- Grimm coefficients

== Mixed regimes ==
Mixed or double regimes are regimes where one peak is due to a temperature-dependent factor (snow or ice melt) and one is due to rainfall. There are many possible combinations, but only some have been studied in more detail. They can also be split into two categories – plain (versions of Beckinsale's plain nival regimes with another peak) and mountain. They can be in general thought of as combinations of two simple regimes but the cold-season pluvial peak is usually in autumn, not in late winter as is common for temperate pluvial regime.

Mixed regimes are usually split into two other categories: the nivo-pluvial and pluvio-nival regimes, the first having a nival peak in late spring (April to June on Northern Hemisphere, October to December on Southern Hemisphere) and the biggest minimum in the winter while the latter usually has a nival peak in early spring (March or April on Northern Hemisphere, September or October on Southern Hemisphere) and the biggest minimum in the summer.

=== Plain mixed regime ===
Beckinsale did not really classify the regimes by the number of factors contributing to the discharge, so such regimes are grouped with simple regimes in his classification as they appear in close proximity to those regimes. For all of his six examples, mixed regimes can be found, although for DFa and DWd, that is quite rare. In the majority of cases, they are nivo-pluvial with the main minimum in winter, except for DFa/b.

Examples of plain mixed regimes for Northern Hemisphere
| Transitional pluvial + pluvial (DFa/b) | Transitional nival + pluvial (DFb/c) | Violent nival spring max. + pluvial (DFc) |
|---|---|---|
| Narev at Suraż, Poland Annual hydrograph: J / F / M / A / M / J / J / A / S / O / N / D; Pardé coefficients; Yearly coefficient: 3.89; Annual variability: 45.353 %; Grimm coefficients: J+F / F+M / M+A / A+M / M+J / J+J / J+A / A+S / S+O / O+N / N+D / D+J; Grimm coefficients | Skardvatnbekken at Skardvatn, Norway Annual hydrograph: J / F / M / A / M / J / J / A / S / O / N / D; Pardé coefficients; Yearly coefficient: 4.38; Annual variability: 38.995 %; Grimm coefficients: J+F / F+M / M+A / A+M / M+J / J+J / J+A / A+S / S+O / O+N / N+D / D+J; Grimm coefficients | Kymijoki at Vuosjärvi, Huopanankoski, Finland Annual hydrograph: J / F / M / A / M / J / J / A / S / O / N / D; Pardé coefficients; Yearly coefficient: 2.27; Annual variability: 27.598 %; Grimm coefficients: J+F / F+M / M+A / A+M / M+J / J+J / J+A / A+S / S+O / O+N / N+D / D+J; Grimm coefficients |
| Prol. cold season min. + pluvial (Dwd) | Nival + Texan (Dfa/Dwa) | Nival + tropical pluvial (Dwb/c) |
| Kolva at Khorey-Ver, Russia Annual hydrograph: J / F / M / A / M / J / J / A / S / O / N / D; Pardé coefficients; Yearly coefficient: undefined; Annual variability: 178.88 %; Grimm coefficients: J+F / F+M / M+A / A+M / M+J / J+J / J+A / A+S / S+O / O+N / N+D / D+J; Grimm coefficients | Sappa Creek at Near Stamford, Nebr., USA Annual hydrograph: J / F / M / A / M / J / J / A / S / O / N / D; Pardé coefficients; Yearly coefficient: 12.58; Annual variability: 79.852 %; Grimm coefficients: J+F / F+M / M+A / A+M / M+J / J+J / J+A / A+S / S+O / O+N / N+D / D+J; Grimm coefficients | Bureya at Malinovka, Russia Annual hydrograph: J / F / M / A / M / J / J / A / S / O / N / D; Pardé coefficients; Yearly coefficient: 603.44; Annual variability: 93.794 %; Grimm coefficients: J+F / F+M / M+A / A+M / M+J / J+J / J+A / A+S / S+O / O+N / N+D / D+J; Grimm coefficients |

=== Mountain mixed regime ===
Mountain mixed regimes are thoroughly researched and quite common in the Alps, and rivers with such regimes rise in most mountain chains. Beckinsale does not distinguish them from plain regimes, however, they are classified rather different from his classification in newer sources.

Mader classifies mixed regimes with the nival peaks corresponding to mild nival or Mader's nival as 'winter nival' and 'autumn nival', depending on the pluvial peak. The winter peak is usually small. In monsoonal areas, the peak can be in summer as well.

Winter nival
Northern Hemisphere

Steinbach at Nußdorf, Germany

Annual hydrograph
| J | F | M | A | M | J | J | A | S | O | N | D |
- Pardé coefficients
- Yearly coefficient: 1.86
- Annual variability: 23.284 %
Grimm coefficients
| J+F | F+M | M+A | A+M | M+J | J+J | J+A | A+S | S+O | O+N | N+D | D+J |
- Grimm coefficients

Southern Hemisphere

Clutha River at Clyde, New Zealand

Annual hydrograph
| J | F | M | A | M | J | J | A | S | O | N | D |
- Pardé coefficients
- Yearly coefficient: 1.4
- Annual variability: 12.143 %
Grimm coefficients
| J+F | F+M | M+A | A+M | M+J | J+J | J+A | A+S | S+O | O+N | N+D | D+J |
- Grimm coefficients

Autumn nival
Northern Hemisphere

Gail at Rattendorf, Austria

Annual hydrograph
| J | F | M | A | M | J | J | A | S | O | N | D |
- Pardé coefficients
- Yearly coefficient: 5.12
- Annual variability: 44.195 %
Grimm coefficients
| J+F | F+M | M+A | A+M | M+J | J+J | J+A | A+S | S+O | O+N | N+D | D+J |
- Grimm coefficients

Southern Hemisphere

Barrancas River at Barrancas, Argentina

Annual hydrograph
| J | F | M | A | M | J | J | A | S | O | N | D |
- Pardé coefficients
- Yearly coefficient: 3.05
- Annual variability: 43.264 %
Grimm coefficients
| J+F | F+M | M+A | A+M | M+J | J+J | J+A | A+S | S+O | O+N | N+D | D+J |
- Grimm coefficients

Summer nival
Northern Hemisphere

Jhelum River at Munshibag, India

Annual hydrograph
| J | F | M | A | M | J | J | A | S | O | N | D |
- Pardé coefficients
- Yearly coefficient: 4.91
- Annual variability: 56.648 %
Grimm coefficients
| J+F | F+M | M+A | A+M | M+J | J+J | J+A | A+S | S+O | O+N | N+D | D+J |
- Grimm coefficients

Mader denoted only those regimes with nival peaks corresponding to transitional nival as 'nivo-pluvial'. Hrvatin in his distinction also differentiated between 'high mountain Alpine nivo-pluvial regime' and 'medium mountain Alpine nivo-pluvial regime', the first showing significant difference between the minima and the other not, although some regimes in his classification also have mild nival peaks. In Japan, the pluvial peak is in the summer.

High mountain Alpine nivo-pluvial regime
Northern Hemisphere

Radovna at Podhom, Slovenia

Annual hydrograph
| J | F | M | A | M | J | J | A | S | O | N | D |
- Pardé coefficients
- Yearly coefficient: 4.21
- Annual variability: 39.101 %
Grimm coefficients
| J+F | F+M | M+A | A+M | M+J | J+J | J+A | A+S | S+O | O+N | N+D | D+J |
- Grimm coefficients

Medium mountain Alpine nivo-pluvial regime
Northern Hemisphere

Kokra at Kokra I, Slovenia

Annual hydrograph
| J | F | M | A | M | J | J | A | S | O | N | D |
- Pardé coefficients
- Yearly coefficient: 2.08
- Annual variability: 24.019 %
Grimm coefficients
| J+F | F+M | M+A | A+M | M+J | J+J | J+A | A+S | S+O | O+N | N+D | D+J |
- Grimm coefficients

Nivo-pluvial with summer peak
Northern Hemisphere

Mu-kawa at Mukawa, Japan

Annual hydrograph
| J | F | M | A | M | J | J | A | S | O | N | D |
- Pardé coefficients
- Yearly coefficient: 10.53
- Annual variability: 63.543 %
Grimm coefficients
| J+F | F+M | M+A | A+M | M+J | J+J | J+A | A+S | S+O | O+N | N+D | D+J |
- Grimm coefficients

In Mader's classification, any regime with a transitional pluvial peak is pluvio-nival. Hrvatin also defines it further with a major overlap to Mader's classification. If minima are rather mild, then it is classified as 'Alpine pluvio-nival regime', if minima are more pronounced but the peaks are mild, then it is classified as 'Dinaric-Alpine pluvio-nival regime' and if the peaks are also pronounced, then it is 'Dinaric pluvio-nival regime'. His 'Pannonian pluvio-nival regime' corresponds to a plain mixed regime. Japan has mixed regimes with tropical pluvial peak.

Alpine pluvio-nival regime
Northern Hemisphere

Savinja at Laško I, Slovenia

Annual hydrograph
| J | F | M | A | M | J | J | A | S | O | N | D |
- Pardé coefficients
- Yearly coefficient: 1.64
- Annual variability: 19.489 %
Grimm coefficients
| J+F | F+M | M+A | A+M | M+J | J+J | J+A | A+S | S+O | O+N | N+D | D+J |
- Grimm coefficients

Southern Hemisphere

Mataura River at Gore highway bridge, New Zealand

Annual hydrograph
| J | F | M | A | M | J | J | A | S | O | N | D |
- Pardé coefficients
- Yearly coefficient: 2.08
- Annual variability: 22.863 %
Grimm coefficients
| J+F | F+M | M+A | A+M | M+J | J+J | J+A | A+S | S+O | O+N | N+D | D+J |
- Grimm coefficients

Dinaric-Alpine pluvio-nival regime
Northern Hemisphere

Ljubija at Verd I, Slovenia

Annual hydrograph
| J | F | M | A | M | J | J | A | S | O | N | D |
- Pardé coefficients
- Yearly coefficient: 2.74
- Annual variability: 25.877 %
Grimm coefficients
| J+F | F+M | M+A | A+M | M+J | J+J | J+A | A+S | S+O | O+N | N+D | D+J |
- Grimm coefficients

Dinaric pluvio-nival regime
Northern Hemisphere

Hubelj at Ajdovščina I, Slovenia

Annual hydrograph
| J | F | M | A | M | J | J | A | S | O | N | D |
- Pardé coefficients
- Yearly coefficient: 3.77
- Annual variability: 33.019 %
Grimm coefficients
| J+F | F+M | M+A | A+M | M+J | J+J | J+A | A+S | S+O | O+N | N+D | D+J |
- Grimm coefficients

Pluvio-nival with summer peak
Northern Hemisphere

Natori-kawa at Natori-bashi, Japan

Annual hydrograph
| J | F | M | A | M | J | J | A | S | O | N | D |
- Pardé coefficients
- Yearly coefficient: 5.04
- Annual variability: 52.996 %
Grimm coefficients
| J+F | F+M | M+A | A+M | M+J | J+J | J+A | A+S | S+O | O+N | N+D | D+J |
- Grimm coefficients

== Complex regimes ==
Complex regimes is the catch-all category for all rivers where the discharge is influenced by many different factors that occur at different times of the year. For rivers that flow through many different climates and have many tributaries from different climates, their regime can become unrepresentative of any area the river's catchment area is in. Many of the world's longest rivers have such regimes, such as the Nile, the Congo, the St. Lawrence River and the Rhone. A special form of such regimes is the uniform regime, where all peaks and minima are extremely mild.

Uniform regime

Albert Nile at Panyango, Uganda

Annual hydrograph
| J | F | M | A | M | J | J | A | S | O | N | D |
- Pardé coefficients
- Yearly coefficient: 1.13
- Annual variability: 4.088 %
Grimm coefficients
| J+F | F+M | M+A | A+M | M+J | J+J | J+A | A+S | S+O | O+N | N+D | D+J |
- Grimm coefficients

== See also ==
- Seasonality

== Bibliography ==
- Beckinsale, Robert P. (1969). Chorley, Richard J. (ed.). River regimes (1st ed.). Methuen & Co. Ltd. pp. 455–470. doi:10.4324/9781003170181. ISBN 978-1-003-17018-1.
- Haines, A.T.; Finlayson, B.L.; McMahon, T.A. (October 1988). "A global classification of river regimes". Applied Geography. 8 (4): 255–272. Bibcode:1988AppGe...8..255H. doi:10.1016/0143-6228(88)90035-5. ISSN 0143-6228 – via Elsevier Science Direct.
- Hrvatin, Mauro (1998). "Discharge Regimes in Slovenia". Geografski Zbornik (PDF or TXT). XXXVIII. Ljubljana: Založba ZRC SAZU. pp. 59–87.
- Mader, Helmut; Steidl, Theo; Wimmer, Reinhard (August 1996). Chovanec, Andreas (ed.). Abflußregime Österreichischer Fließgewässer [Discharge Regimes of Austrian Rivers] (PDF) (in German). Wien: Umweltbundesamt. ISBN 3-85457-336-7.
- Shaw, Elizabeth M. (1994). Hydrology in Practice (3rd ed.). Chapman & Hall. ISBN 0-203-01325-5.
