= Baseflow residence time =

Baseflow residence time (often mean baseflow residence time) is a parameter useful in describing the mixing of waters from the infiltration of precipitation and pre-event groundwater in a watershed. It describes the average amount of time that water within the transient water supply resides in a watershed. Many methods of determining baseflow residence time have been developed, mostly involving mathematical models using a convolution integral approach with isotopic or chemical data as the input. Other methods that do not require such extensive and expensive data collection include Brutsaert and Nieber, which uses aquifer parameters as inputs, and Vitvar et al., which uses the stream flow hydrograph to determine baseflow recession parameters.

== See also ==
- Baseflow
- Hydrograph
- Time of concentration
