= Streamflow =

Flow of water in streams and other channels

Streamflow, or channel runoff, is the flow of water in streams and other channels, and is a major element of the water cycle. It is one runoff component, the movement of water from the land to waterbodies, the other component being surface runoff. Water flowing in channels comes from surface runoff from adjacent hillslopes, from groundwater flow out of the ground, and from water discharged from pipes. The discharge of water flowing in a channel is measured using stream gauges or can be estimated by the Manning equation. The record of flow over time is called a hydrograph. Flooding occurs when the volume of water exceeds the capacity of the channel.

== Role in the water cycle ==
Streams play a critical role in the hydrologic cycle that is essential for all life on Earth. A diversity of biological species, from unicellular organisms to vertebrates, depend on flowing-water systems for their habitat and food resources. Rivers are major aquatic landscapes for all manners of plants and animals. Rivers even help keep the aquifers underground full of water by discharging water downward through their streambeds. In addition to that, the oceans stay full of water because rivers and runoff continually refreshes them. Streamflow is the main mechanism by which water moves from the land to the oceans or to basins of interior drainage.

== Sources ==
Stream discharge is derived from four sources: channel precipitation, overland flow, interflow, and groundwater.

- Channel precipitation is the moisture falling directly on the water surface, and in most streams, it adds very little to discharge.
- Groundwater enters the streambed where the channel intersects the water table, providing a steady supply of water, termed baseflow, during both dry and rainy periods. Because of the large supply of groundwater available to the streams and the slowness of the response of groundwater to precipitation events, baseflow changes only gradually over time, and it is rarely the main cause of flooding. However, it does contribute to flooding by providing a stage onto which runoff from other sources is superimposed.
- Interflow is water that infiltrates the soil and then moves laterally to the stream channel in the zone above the water table. Much of this water is transmitted within the soil, some of it moving within the horizons. Next to baseflow, it is the most important source of discharge for streams in forested lands. Overland flow in heavily forested areas makes negligible contributions to streamflow.
- In dry regions, cultivated, and urbanized areas, overland flow or surface runoff is usually a major source of streamflow. Overland flow is a stormwater runoff that begins as thin layer of water that moves very slowly (typically less than 0.25 feet per second) over the ground. Under intensive rainfall and in the absence of barriers such as rough ground, vegetation, and absorbing soil, it can mount up, rapidly reaching stream channels in minutes and causing sudden rises in discharge. The quickest response times between rainfall and streamflow occur in urbanized areas where yard drains, street gutters, and storm sewers collect overland flow and route it to streams straightaway. Runoff velocities in storm sewer pipes can reach 10 to 15 feet per second.

== Mechanisms that cause changes in streamflow ==
Rivers are always moving, which is good for environment, as stagnant water does not stay fresh and inviting very long. There are many factors, both natural and human-induced, that cause rivers to continuously change:

Natural mechanisms

- Runoff from rainfall and snowmelt
- Evaporation from soil and surface-water bodies
- Transpiration by vegetation
- Ground-water discharge from aquifers
- Ground-water recharge from surface-water bodies
- Sedimentation of lakes and wetlands
- Formation or dissipation of glaciers, snowfields, and permafrost

Human-induced mechanisms

- Surface-water withdrawals and transbasin diversions
- River-flow regulation for hydropower and navigation
- Construction, removal, and sedimentation of reservoirs and stormwater retention ponds
- Stream channelization and levee construction
- Drainage or restoration of wetlands
- Land use changes such as urbanization that alter rates of erosion, infiltration, overland flow, or evapotranspiration
- Wastewater outfalls
- Irrigation

Climate Change

- Increase/decrease in precipitation
- Air temperature change
- altered streamflow variability
- reduced snowpack
- increased droughts and floods

Increases/decreases in precipitation contribute significantly to changes in streamflow.

Researchers from the DRI examined over 500 watersheds across the USA and found increased winter temperatures are causing more extreme fluctuations in streamflow.

Data show that watersheds with lots of snow are receiving more precipitation as rain than previously. As a result streams now have more water coming in quick surges from rainstorms, rather than the slow flow of melting snow. These fluctuations could also be attributed to faster snowpack melting due to higher temperatures.

From a groundwater perspective, higher evaporation and evapotranspiration rates reduce soil moisture and groundwater recharge, lowering baseflow (the sustained part of streamflow from groundwater).

== Measurement ==
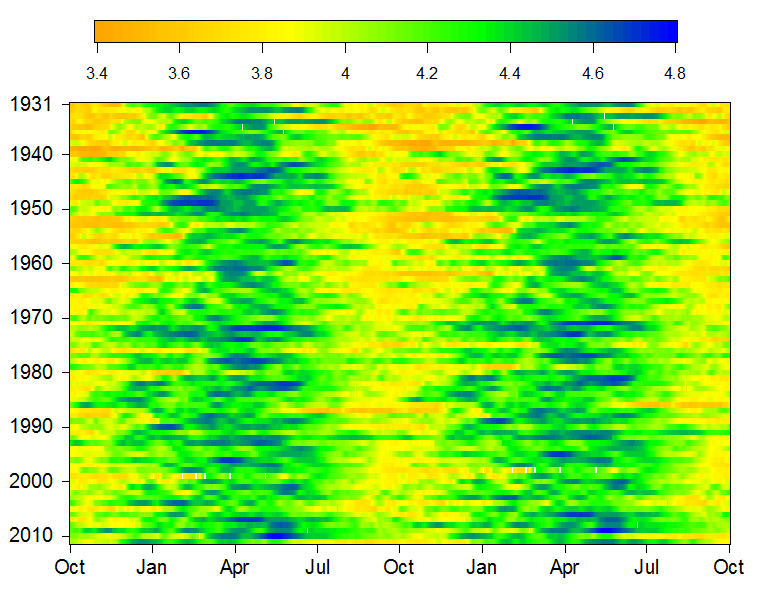
Mississippi River streamflow in log_{10} cubic meters per second measured daily at Vicksburg, MS, US.

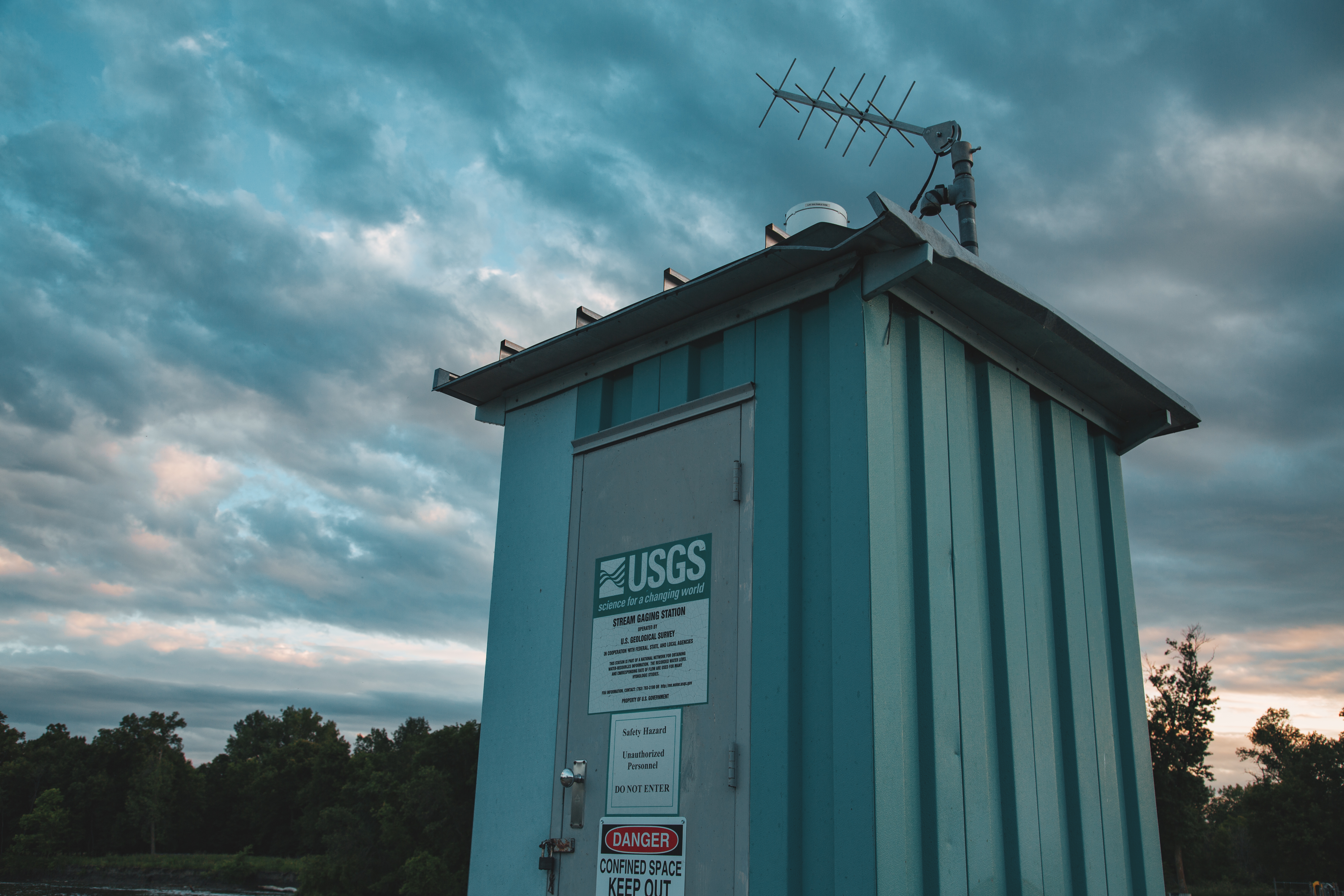
United States Geological Survey stream gaging station on the Minnesota River at Lac qui Parle Dam.

Streamflow is measured as an amount of water passing through a specific point over time. The units used in the United States are cubic feet per second, while in most other countries cubic meters per second are utilized. There are a variety of ways to measure the discharge of a stream or canal. A stream gauge provides continuous flow over time at one location for water resource and environmental management or other purposes. Streamflow values are better indicators than gage height of conditions along the whole river. Measurements of streamflow are made about every six weeks by United States Geological Survey (USGS) personnel. They wade into the stream to make the measurement or do so from a boat, bridge, or cableway over the stream. For each gaging station, a relation between gage height and streamflow is determined by simultaneous measurements of gage height and streamflow over the natural range of flows (from very low flows to floods). This relation provides the streamflow data from that station. For purposes that do not require a continuous measurement of stream flow over time, current meters or acoustic Doppler velocity profilers can be used. For small streams—a few meters wide or smaller—weirs may be installed.

=== Approximation ===
One informal method that provides an approximation of the stream flow termed the orange method or float method is:

1. Measure a length of stream, and mark the start and finish points. The longest length without changing stream conditions is desired to obtain the most accurate measurement.
2. Place an orange at the starting point and measure the time for it to reach the finish point with a stopwatch. Repeat this at least three times and average the measurement times.
3. Express velocity in meters per second. If the measurements were made at midstream (maximum velocity), the mean stream velocity is approximately 0.8 of the measured velocity for rough (rocky) bottom conditions and 0.9 of the measured velocity for smooth (mud, sand, smooth bedrock) bottom conditions.

=== Monitoring ===
In the United States, streamflow gauges are funded primarily from state and local government funds. In fiscal year 2008, the USGS provided 35% of the funding for everyday operation and maintenance of gauges. Additionally, USGS uses hydrographs to study streamflow in rivers. A hydrograph is a chart showing, most often, river stage (height of the water above an arbitrary altitude) and streamflow (amount of water, usually in cubic feet per second). Other properties, such as rainfall and water quality parameters can also be plotted.

=== Forecasting ===
For most streams especially those with a small watershed, no record of discharge is available. In that case, it is possible to make discharge estimates using the rational method or some modified version of it. However, if chronological records of discharge are available for a stream, a short term forecast of discharge can be made for a given rainstorm using a hydrograph.

In recent years, Artificial Intelligence has made it possible to perform streamflow forecasting more efficiently. AI techniques, in particular LSTM models, have greater forecasting accuracy than conventional models.

Long short-term memory networks began to gain attention in streamflow forecasting, due to their high capability to handle sequential time-series data. Studies showcase the superiority of LSTM to traditional physics-based models, like the CaMa Flood calibrated model for streamflow and climate data or SMA-SAC runoff forecasting model. Also, LSTM have made their way into the river streamflow forecasting domain. The effectiveness of LSTM networks for daily predictions and 10-day mean flow predictions at Upper Yangtze and Hun river basins, respectively, was assessed. Overall, the LSTM yielded better forecasting capabilities compared to traditional hydrological model.

Combining numerical and machine learning models can also yield greater forecasting outcomes, due to its nonlinear learning ability.

In addition, LSTM can process highly varied data in comparison to other models.

==== Unit hydrograph method ====
This method involves building a graph in which the discharge generated by a rainstorm of a given size is plotted over time, usually hours or days. It is called the unit hydrograph method because it addresses only the runoff produced by a particular rainstorm in a specified period of time—the time taken for a river to rise, peak, and fall in response to a storm.

Once a rainfall-runoff relationship is established, then subsequent rainfall data can be used to forecast streamflow for selected storms, called standard storms. A standard rainstorm is a high intensity storm of some known magnitude and frequency. One method of unit hydrograph analysis involves expressing the hour by hour or day by day increase in streamflow as a percentage of total runoff. Plotted on a graph, these data from the unit hydrograph for that storm, which represents the runoff added to the pre-storm baseflow.

To forecast the flows in a large drainage basin using the unit hydrograph method would be difficult because in a large basin geographic conditions may vary significantly from one part of the basin to another. This is especially so with the distribution of rainfall because an individual rainstorm rarely covers the basin evenly. As a result, the basin does not respond as a unit to a given storm, making it difficult to construct a reliable hydrograph.

==== Magnitude and frequency method ====
For large basins, where unit hydrograph might not be useful and reliable, the magnitude and frequency method is used to calculate the probability of recurrence of large flows based on records of past years' flows. In United States, these records are maintained by the Hydrological Division of the USGS for large streams. For a basin with an area of 5,000 square miles or more, the river system is typically gauged at five to ten places.

The data from each gauging station apply to the part of the basin upstream that location. Given several decades of peak annual discharges for a river, limited projections can be made to estimate the size of some large flow that has not been experienced during the period of record. The technique involves projecting the curve (graph line) formed when peak annual discharges are plotted against their respective recurrence intervals. However, in most cases the curve bends strongly, making it difficult to plot a projection accurately. This problem can be overcome by plotting the discharge and/or recurrence interval data on logarithmic graph paper. Once the plot is straightened, a line can be ruled drawn through the points. A projection can then be made by extending the line beyond the points and then reading the appropriate discharge for the recurrence interval in question.

== Relationship to the environment ==
Runoff of water in channels is responsible for transport of sediment, nutrients, and pollution downstream. Without streamflow, the water in a given watershed would not be able to naturally progress to its final destination in a lake or ocean. This would disrupt the ecosystem. Streamflow is one important route of water from the land to lakes and oceans. The other main routes are surface runoff (the flow of water from the land into nearby watercourses that occurs during precipitation and as a result of irrigation), flow of groundwater into surface waters, and the flow of water from constructed pipes and channels.

== Relationship to society ==
Streamflow confers on society both benefits and hazards. Runoff downstream is a means to collect water for storage in dams for power generation of water abstraction. The flow of water assists transport downstream. A given watercourse has a maximum streamflow rate that can be accommodated by the channel that can be calculated. If the streamflow exceeds this maximum rate, as happens when an excessive amount of water is present in the watercourse, the channel cannot handle all the water, and flooding occurs.

The 1993 Mississippi river flood, the largest ever recorded on the river, was a response to a heavy, long duration spring and summer rainfalls. Early rains saturated the soil over more than a 300,000 square miles of the upper watershed, greatly reducing infiltration and leaving soils with little or no storage capacity. As rains continued, surface depressions, wetlands, ponds, ditches, and farm fields filled with overland flow and rainwater. With no remaining capacity to hold water, additional rainfall was forced from the land into tributary channels and thence to the Mississippi River. For more than a month, the total load of water from hundreds of tributaries exceeded the Mississippi's channel capacity, causing it to spill over its banks onto adjacent floodplains. Where the flood waters were artificially constricted by an engineered channel bordered by constructed levees and unable to spill onto large section of floodplain, the flood levels forced even higher.

== See also ==
- Hydrological modelling
- List of rivers by discharge
- Losing stream
- Perennial stream
- Runoff model (reservoir)
- Stream bed
- Water resources
- Open-channel flow
