= Baseflow =

Stream flow between precipitation events

Baseflow (also called drought flow, groundwater recession flow, low flow, low-water flow, low-water discharge and sustained or fair-weather runoff) is the portion of the streamflow that is sustained between precipitation events, fed to streams by delayed pathways. It should not be confused with groundwater flow. Fair weather flow is also called base flow.

== Importance ==
Baseflow is important for sustaining human centers of population and ecosystems. This is especially true for watersheds that do not rely on snowmelt. Different ecological processes will occur at different parts of the hydrograph. During the baseflow ascending limb, there is frequently more stream area and habitat available for water-dependent species, spawning salmon for example. During the recession limb, there is increasingly less stream area, and indigenous species are more adept at surviving in low flow conditions than introduced species.

== Geology ==
Baseflow is derived from bedrock water storage near surface valley soils and riparian zones. Water percolates to groundwater and then flows to a body of water^{.} Baseflow depletion curve is the declining of baseflow/groundwater and soil reserves. The volume and rate of water moving as baseflow can be affected by macropores, micropores, and other fractured conditions in the soil and shallow geomorphic features. Infiltration to recharge subsurface storage increases baseflow. Evapotranspiration reduces baseflow because trees absorb water from the ground. In the fall baseflow can increase before it starts to rain because the trees drop their leaves and stop drinking as much water. River incision can decrease the baseflow by lowering the water table and aquifer.

Good baseflow is connected to surface water that is located in permeable, soluble, or highly fractured bedrock. Bad baseflow is in crystalline or massive bedrock with minor fracturing and doesn't store water. Losing reaches is when the water flow decreases as it travels downstream and is fracturing deeper than surface water or in karst geology because limestone and dolomite high storage. Gaining reaches is when flow increases as it travels downstream. Gaining reaches are common in humid mountainous regions where the water table is above the surface water and the water flows from high head to low head following Darcy's law.

== Measurement ==
Methods for identifying baseflow sources and residence/transit time include using solutes and tracers. Solutes that originate in distinct areas of the watershed can be used to source baseflow-geochemical signatures. Tracers may be inserted into different parts of the watershed to identify flow paths and transit times.

Methods for summarizing baseflow from an existing streamflow record include event based low flow statistics, flow duration curve, metrics that explain proportioning of baseflow to total flow, and the baseflow recession curve which can be used on ungauged streams based on empirical relationship between watershed characteristics and baseflow at gauged sites.

Certain parameters of baseflow, such as the mean residence time and the baseflow recession curve, can be useful in describing the mixing of waters (such as from precipitation and groundwater) and the level of groundwater contribution to streamflow in catchments.

== Anthropogenic effects ==
Anthropogenic effects to baseflow include forestry, urbanization, and agriculture. Forest cover has high infiltration and recharge because of tree roots. Removal of forest cover can cause a short-term increase in mean flow and baseflow because there is less interception and evapotranspiration. Urbanization includes a re-organization of surface and subsurface pathways so that water is flushed through catchments because of reduced hydraulic resistance, Manning's n, channels and impervious surfaces which decreases infiltration. In urban areas water is often imported from outside the watershed from deep wells and reservoirs. The pipes that transport the water often leak 20-25% to the subsurface which can actually increase baseflow. Agriculture can lower baseflow if water diverted from stream for irrigation, or can raise baseflow if water is used from a different watershed. Pastures can increase compaction and reduce organic matter with reduces infiltration and baseflow.

== See also ==
- Baseflow residence time
- Hydrograph
- Time of concentration
