= Khorey-Ver =

- Хорей-Вер
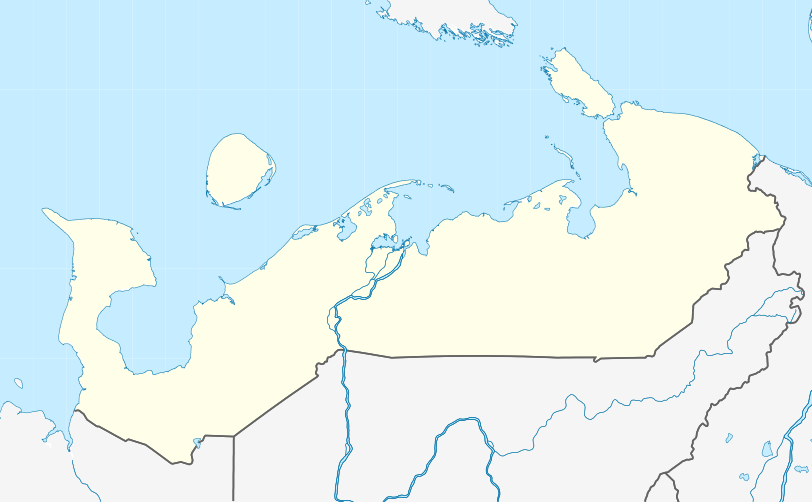
- Location in Russia Khorey-Ver (Russia)
- Coordinates: 67°24′57″N 58°2′28″E
- Country: Russia
- Federal subject: Nenets Autonomous Okrug
- District: Zapolyarny
- Municipality: Khorey-Versky Village Council
- Elevation: 73 m (240 ft)

Population (2010)
  - Total: 739
- Time zone: UTC+5 (YEKT)
- Postal code: 166746
- Area code: +7 81857

Khorey-Ver, Chorey-Ver or Khoreyver (Russian: Хорей-Вер) is a village with a rural settlement council in Nenets Autonomous Okrug, Russia situated along the Kolva river with a small airport, twelve streets, a secondary school, a boarding school, a district hospital, a kindergarten, a cultural center, a bakery, several shops and a power station. Its population in 2010 was 739, consisting of around 370 Nenets, a decrease from 842 in 2002 and the main occupation of the population is reindeer hunting. Since the village is quite remote, the village receives two flights a week from Naryan-Mar.

The name of the village 'Khorey-Ver' directly translates in Nenets to 'direct forest' or 'straight forest'. The village was founded in 1926 when several families that hunted reindeer gathered to form the settlement and in 1939, they received permission in partnerships to hunt and fish, and later to farm; the partnership was named 'Ilyich' after Vladimir Lenin's middle name.
