= Hyetograph =

Graph of rainfall intensity over time

A hyetograph is a graphical representation of the distribution of rainfall intensity over time. For instance, in the 24-hour rainfall distributions as developed by the Soil Conservation Service (now the NRCS or National Resources Conservation Service), rainfall intensity progressively increases until it reaches a maximum and then gradually decreases. Where this maximum occurs and how fast the maximum is reached is what differentiates one distribution from another. One important aspect to understand is that the distributions are for design storms, not necessarily actual storms. In other words, a real storm may not behave in this same fashion. The maximum intensity may not be reached as uniformly as shown in the SCS hyetographs.

== See also ==
- Voronoi diagram - a method adaptable for calculating the average precipitation over an area
