= Time of concentration =

Water measurement

In hydrology, the time of concentration measures the response of a watershed to a rain event. It is defined as the time needed for water to flow from the most remote point in a watershed to the watershed outlet. It is a function of the topography, geology, and land use within the watershed. A number of methods can be used to calculate time of concentration, including the Kirpich (1940) and NRCS (1997) methods.

Time of concentration is useful in predicting flow rates that would result from hypothetical storms, which are based on statistically derived return periods through IDF curves. For many (often economic) reasons, it is important for engineers and hydrologists to be able to accurately predict the response of a watershed to a given rain event. This can be important for infrastructure development (design of bridges, culverts, etc.) and management, as well as to assess flood risk such as the ARkStorm-scenario.

== Representation ==
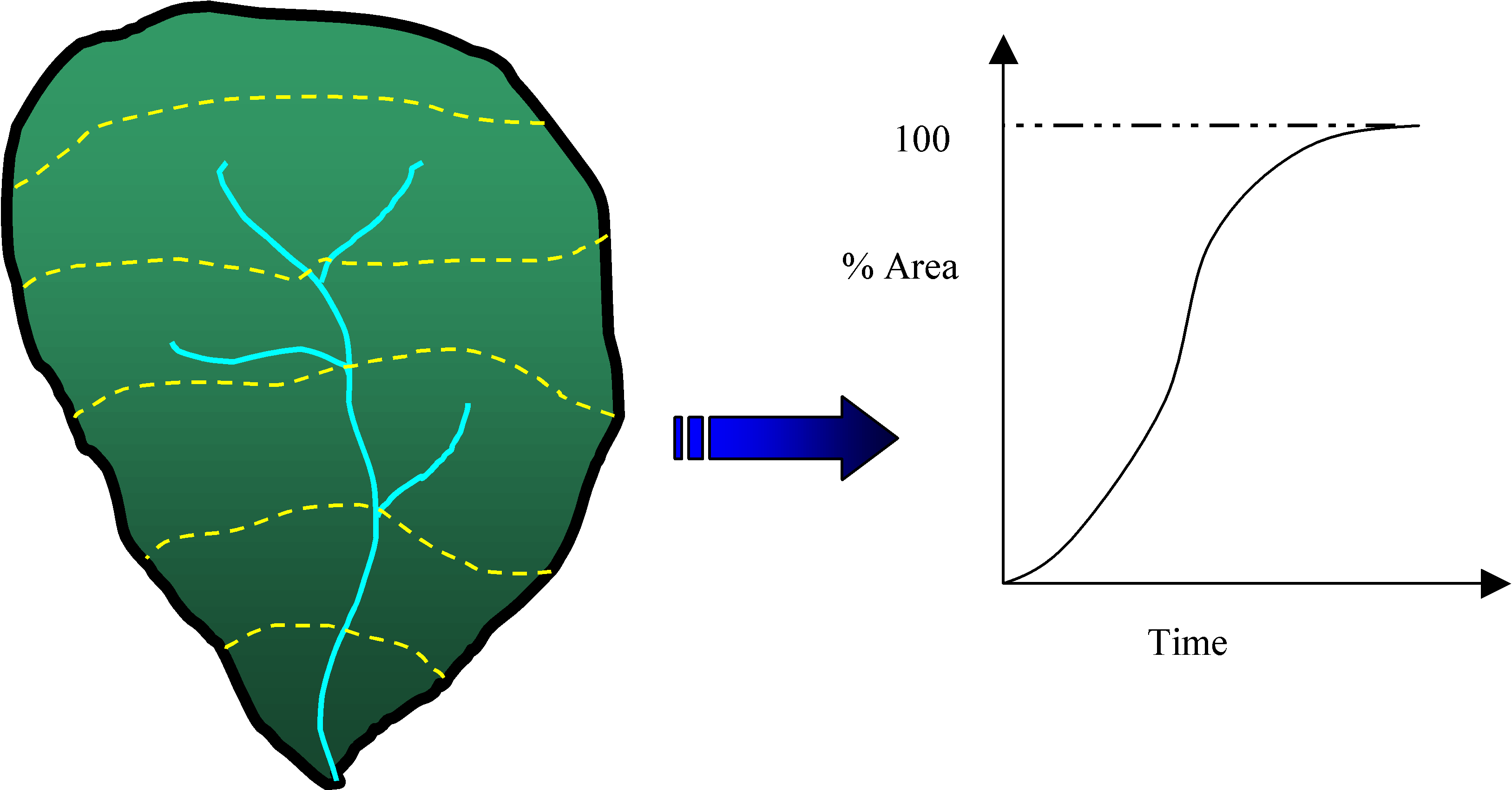
In this simplified example, the watershed outlet is located at the bottom of the picture with a stream flowing through it. Moving up the map, we can say that rainfall which lands on all of the places along the first yellow line will reach the watershed outlet at exactly the same time. This is true for every yellow line, with each line further away from the outlet corresponding to a greater travel time for runoff traveling to the outlet.

Much like a topographic map showing lines of equal elevation, a map with isolines can be constructed to show locations with the same travel time to the watershed outlet.

The spatial representation of travel time can be transformed into a cumulative distribution plot detailing how travel times are distributed throughout the area of the watershed.
