= Transpirational cooling (biological) =

Explains the role of Transpiration in mitigating climate change

Transpirational cooling is the cooling provided as plants transpire water. Excess heat generated from solar radiation is damaging to plant cells and thermal injury occurs during drought or when there is rapid transpiration which produces wilting. Green vegetation contributes to moderating climate by being cooler than adjacent bare earth or constructed areas. As plant leaves transpire they use energy to evaporate water aggregating up to a huge volume globally every day.

An individual tree can transpire hundreds of liters of water per day. For every 100 liters of water transpired, the tree then cools by 70 kWh. Urban heat island effects can be attributed to the replacement of vegetation by constructed surfaces. Deforested areas reveal a higher temperature than adjacent intact forest. Forests and other natural ecosystems support climate stabilisation.

== Transpiration and cooling ==
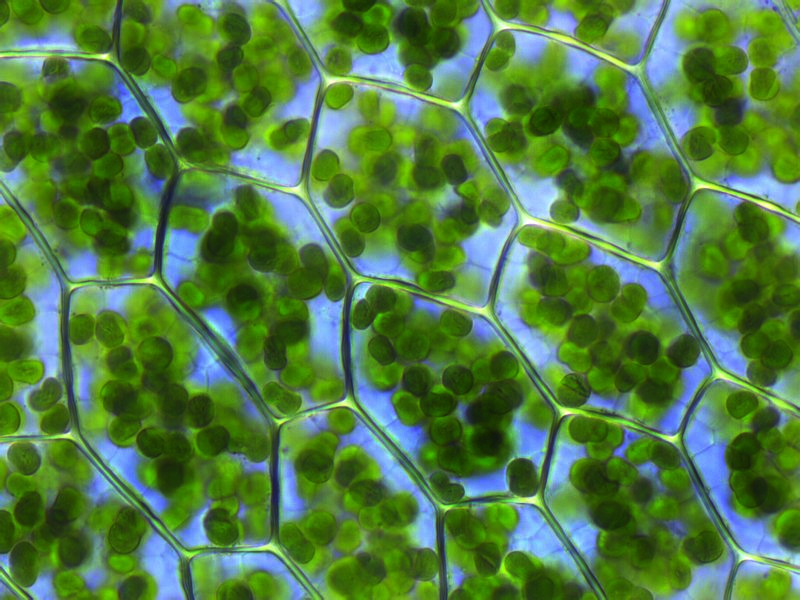
Chloroplasts in leaf cells containing chlorophyll

Evapotranspiration is the combined process moving water from the earth's surface into the atmosphere. Transpiration is the movement of water through a plant and out of its leaves and other aerial parts into the atmosphere. This movement is driven by solar energy. In the tallest trees, such as Sequoia sempervirens, the water rises well over 100 metres from root-tip to canopy leaves. Such trees also exploit evaporation to keep the surface cool. Water vapour from evapotranspiration mixed with air moves upwards to the point of saturation and then, helped by the emissions of cloud condensation nuclei, forms clouds. Each gram molecule (mole) of condensing water will bring about a marked 1200-fold plus reduction in volume.The simultaneous release of latent heat will drive air from below to fill the partial vacuum. The energy required for the surrounding air to move in is readily calculated from the small (one-fifteenth of latent heat) reduction in temperature.

A small amount of that water transpired is used for growth and metabolism. Photosynthesis takes place in the cells of plants and other organisms such as algae, that contain chlorophyll. This process uses the radiant energy from the sun to split water molecules into hydrogen and oxygen that when combined with the carbon sourced from carbon dioxide, produces sugars. Photosynthesis is therefore the basis of almost all food production and produces oxygen as a byproduct.

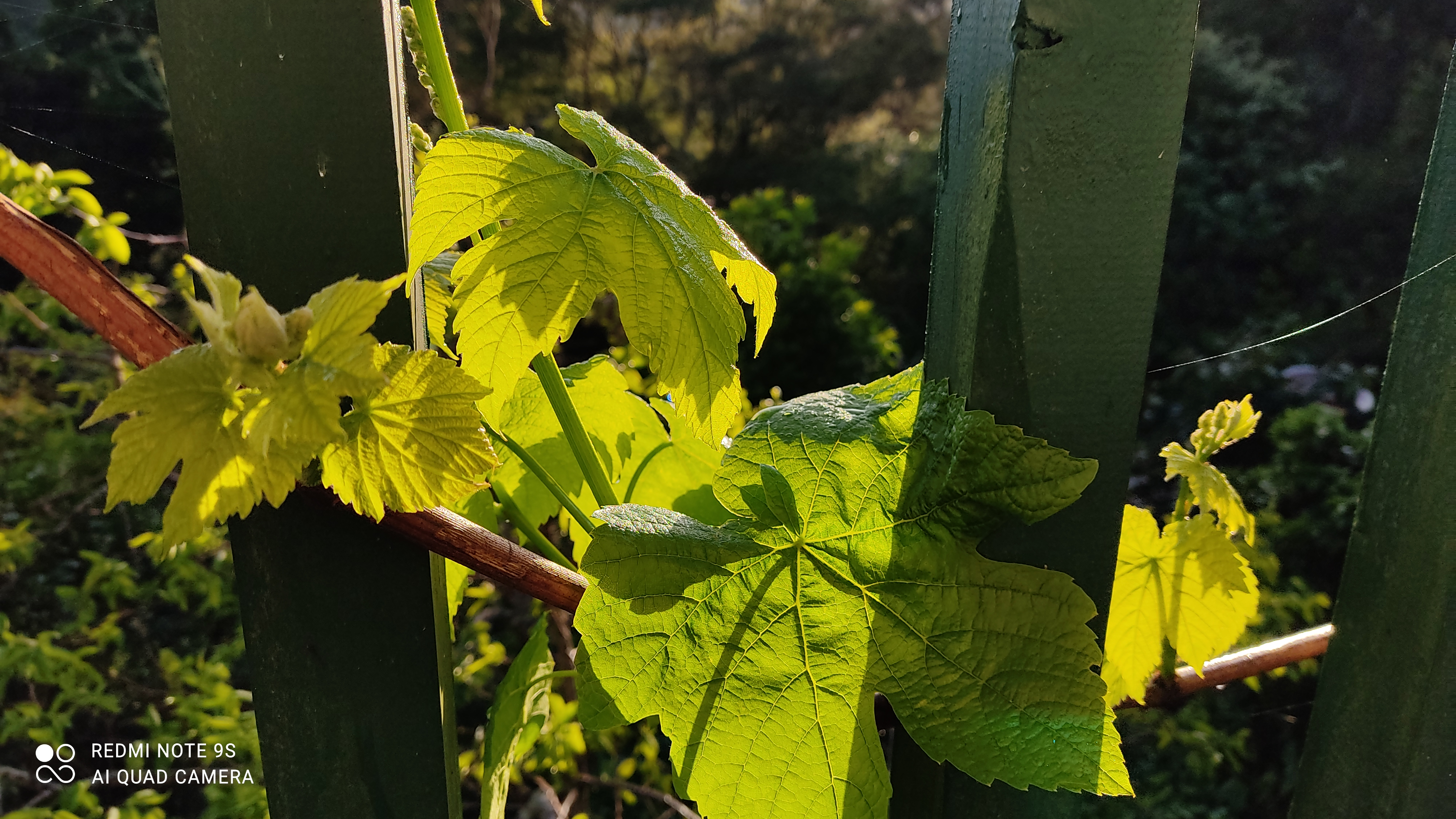
These grape leaves are translucent enabling some sunlight to pass through to shaded leaves. The shading of leaves by the balustrades and other leaves reveals the degree of translucence.

Leaves have many functions. In addition to receiving water from the roots and creating the raw materials for photosynthesis, they also have a large internal surface area to enable the exchange of gases. Their stomata control the flow of water vapour out of the leaf and air into the leaf. In many plants, this is achieved in a structure thin enough to be semi-translucent, to enable some light to pass through to neighbouring leaves. The water that becomes raw material for sugar production, also cools the leaf and supports its structure through the pressure of turgidity. In 2022, attempts to mass-produce artificial leaves to replicate this process and create hydrogen were still in the development stage. All organic matter, living and dead, originated as sugars. Part of the process of creating those sugars was splitting the water molecule into its component parts. Vegetation has a huge influence on climate, enacted through photosynthesis and transpiration.

Botanists have calculated that there are about 600 square inches [3,871 cm^{2}] of surface inside a leaf for every cubic inch [16.38 cm^{3}] of its bulk and that a large elm tree has in all some 15 million leaves within an area, if spread out whole, of nearly 10 acres [4.05 ha] or, if unfolded into the sum total of air-breathing light-absorbing surfaces of all the internal chloroplasts something like 25 square miles [64.75 square kilometres].

Plants cool when they transpire. Evaporating water and transmitting it through leaf stomata requires a lot of energy. Fred Pearce states that "a single tree transpiring a hundred litres of water a day has a cooling power equivalent to two household air-conditioning units" (p. 29). An individual tree can transpire hundreds of litres of water per day. Transpiring 100 litres is equivalent to a cooling power of 70 kWh. Jan Pokorny posits that a tree with a crown of 5 metres diameter covers an area of about 20m^{2}. Of the 150 kWh falling on the crown, 1% is used for photosynthesis, 10% reflected as light energy, 5 to 10% as sensible heat with the remaining 79 to 84% entering the process of transpiration.

If a larger tree has a sufficient water supply, it can evaporate more than 100 L of water a day. In order to evaporate 100 L of water, approximately 70 kWh (250 MJ) of solar energy is needed. This energy is hidden in water vapor as latent heat and is released again during the process of condensation to liquid water.

Extrapolated to a hectare, the cooling power of a closed canopy is 35,000 kWh a day.

Tokyo as an example of an urban heat island

Cities with constructed surfaces and devegetation are typically warmer than adjacent countryside. This phenomenon is known as urban heat islands. For example Tokyo's average September temperature has increased by almost 2 °C. over 100 years. This differential would increase in the summer months. Significant increases for cities in the tropics such as Dhaka are projected, accelerated by urban growth and intensification. The city of Melbourne "plans to plant 3000 trees in Melbourne every year to increase the resilience of the urban forest and to cool our city by 4°C." Increasing tree cover and evapotranspiration provides a localised mitigation solution.

On a larger scale, the Mau Forest complex in Western Kenya was deforested from 5,200 km^{2} in 1986 to 3,400 km^{2} in 2009. Temperatures in deforested areas were found to have increased by approximately 2°C between 1984 and 2020.

There were about six trillion trees on the planet, but human activity has destroyed roughly half. Increasing terrestrial biomass will cool the planet. Of the latent heat that escapes at recondensation at cloud level half departs the atmosphere into space, as the photons escape in a part of the spectrum that does not get reabsorbed by greenhouse gases.

Using satellite imagery, the impact of regeneration processes restoring vegetation in arid areas is visible from space and can tracked over time. Vegetation restoration is clearly visible in images of the Penbamoto project in Tanzania. The data associated with these images reveal a temperature reduction in the topsoil up to 0.75 °C. This temperature reduction was achieved in four years. We can anticipate a larger reduction as the vegetation cover increases.

== The movement of water vapour and thermal energy in the atmosphere ==
The movement of heat embodied in water vapour as it leaves vegetation is not well understood given the complexity of the dynamics. While the movement of water into the atmosphere through evapotranspiration and consequent cooling is broadly accepted, the movement of water further into the atmosphere is more contentious. There are observable phenomena that provide some clues; mornings following cloudless skies will be cooler than cloudy nights, and deserts get very hot during the day and cool rapidly at night. Heat transfer physics are complex, and involve energy carriers including photons. When energy is freed upon condensation, photons are emitted, transferring energy both upward and downward in the atmosphere. Oceans add further complexity of atmospheric dynamics.

A 2022 World Resources Institute report says that albedo, surface roughness, and aerosols, along with evapotranspiration, generate clouds that increase the albedo cooling effect. They calculate that reduced emissions from tropical forest loss could achieve 2.8 gigatonnes of CO_{2} per year, and an additional 1.4 gigatonnes of CO_{2} per year of additional cooling through these albedo effects.

== Using thermal imaging to illustrate transpirational cooling ==
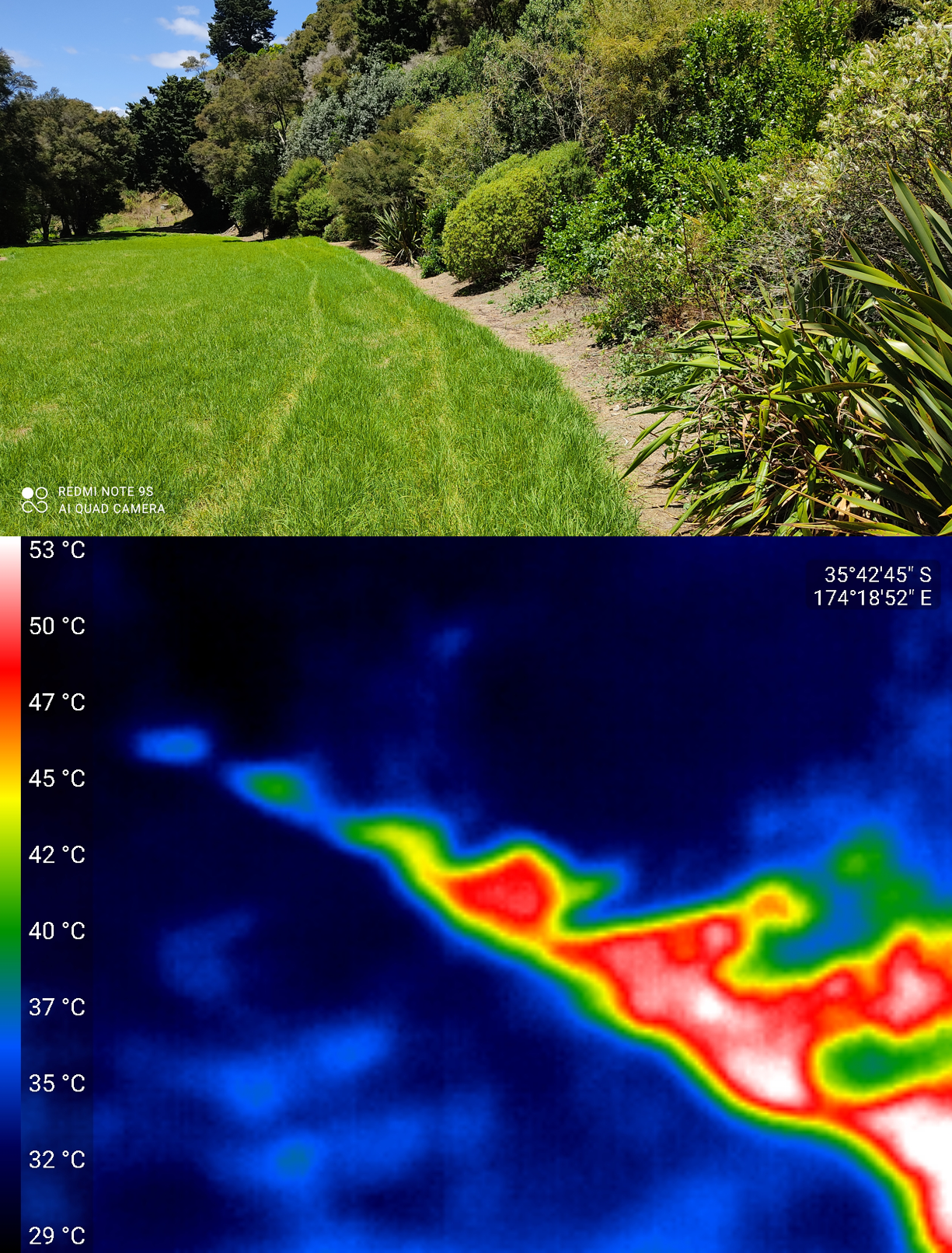
Thermal image and a visual image of Coronation Reserve reveal the temperature differential

Thermal imaging captures the infrared radiation emitted from an object. Michal Kravčík, Jan Pokorný and co-authors used thermographs to demonstrate the temperature differential between vegetation and constructed surfaces in their 2007 Water for the recovery of the climate - a new water paradigm.

The images to the right were taken with a thermal lens mounted on a mobile phone alongside visual images for reference points. A 20 °C or greater temperature differential between vegetation and was often recorded. The three images here pair thermal images and visual images. They reveal significant temperature differences between vegetated and bare surfaces. The image of the Coronation Reserve shows an areas of turf and the margin of native forest separated by a herbicide strip. The bottom image is a thermal image with a slightly different perspective, mainly caused by different camera lenses. The key information distilled from these images is the temperature differences. The grass and the forest margin have similar heat signatures. Temperatures range from 29 to 37 °C. while the dividing herbicide strip reaches 53 °C. Note also the vehicle tracks in the top image with roughly proximate higher temperature readings in the bottom image with an 8 °C. differential. Over time vehicles compact soil structure leading to reduced plant growth, especially when vehicles drive on wet soils. This image reveals that turf can be as cooling as forest.

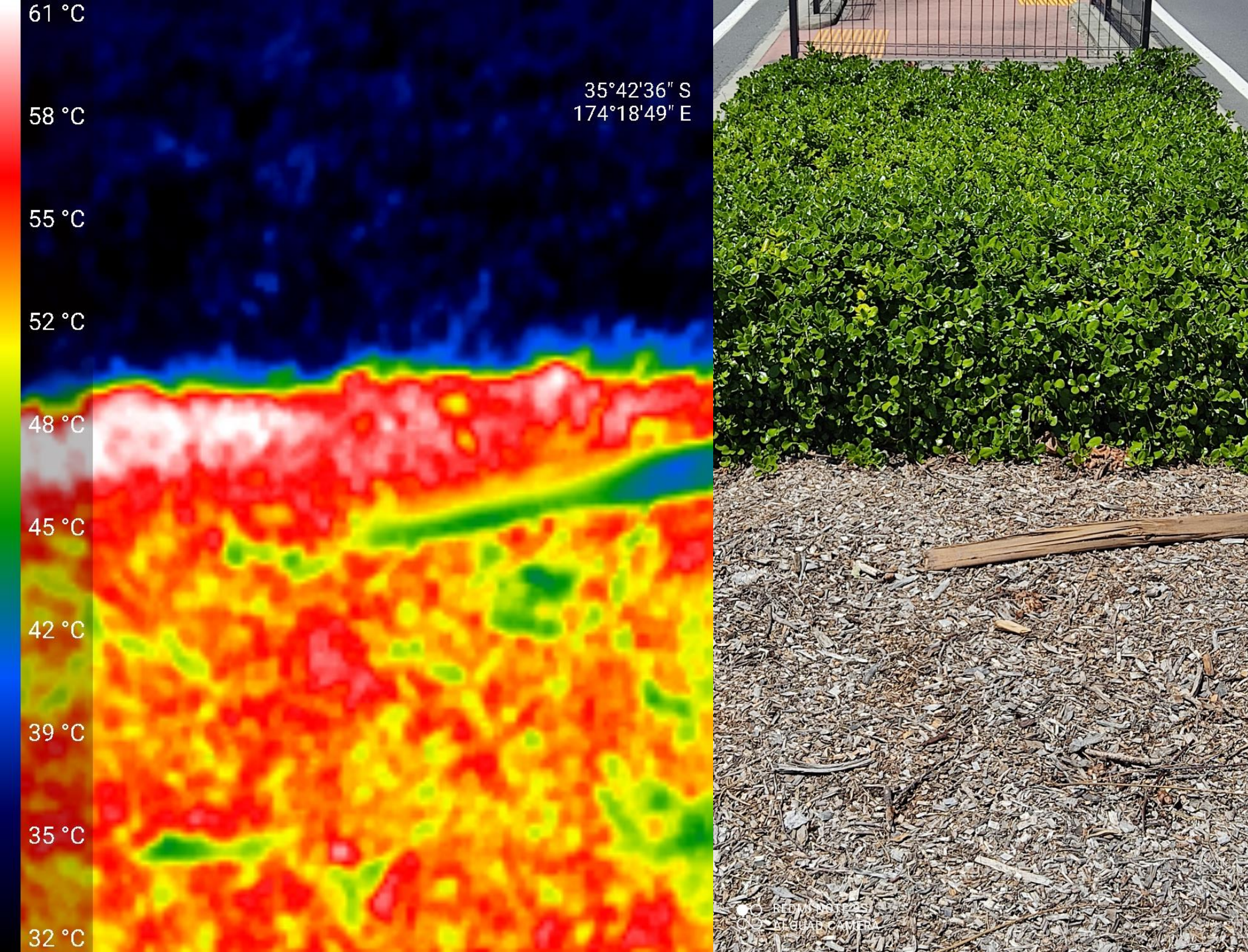
The temperature of Coprosma repens 'Poor Knights" groundcover on a road meridian contrasted with much hotter mulch.

A second side-by-side comparison of thermal and visual images are of a traffic meridian. The ground cover plants are Coprosma repens 'Poor Knights'. The mulch, at its hottest, is 61 °C. The Coprosma are as cool as 32 °C - a 29 °C temperature difference.

== Significance for climate mitigation ==
Non-vegetated or constructed surfaces absorb incoming solar radiation striking that energy and re-radiating it as infrared heat with long waveforms. This is sensible heat in that it can be sensed. Temperature is changed without a change of state. By contrast latent heat (hidden heat) results from a change of state without a change of temperature. For example as radiant energy warms a body of water it raises the temperature generating sensible heat. Water evaporated from the body of water changes state as latent heat. To change one gram of liquid water to vapour requires 540 calories of heat, and if that water vapour condenses back to liquid water 540 calories are released. One climate mitigation pathway is for water vapour to carry energy back into the atmosphere where some of that energy will dissipate into space.

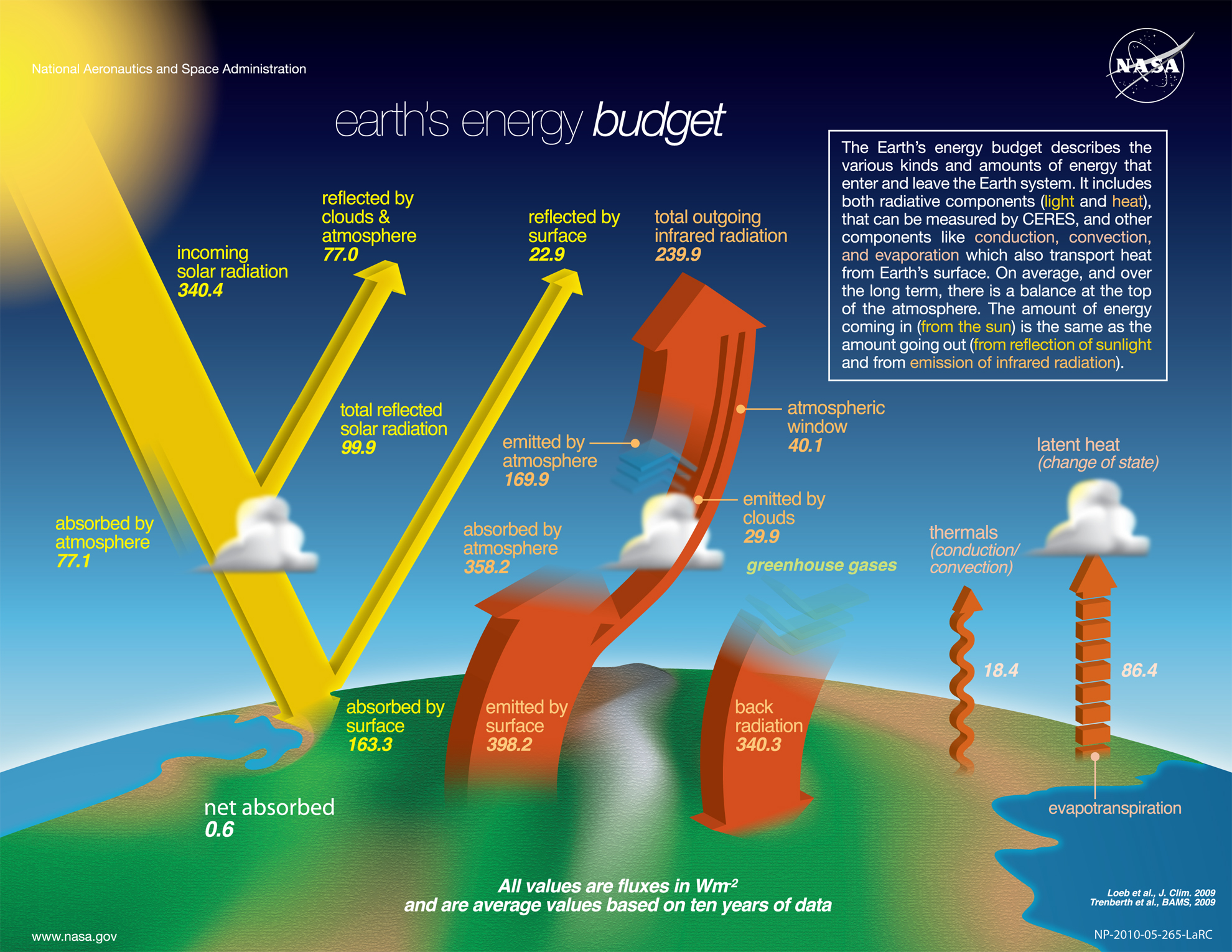
Earth's energy budget (NASA)

Earth's energy budget reveals the pathways of solar energy to earth, its cycling in earth systems and atmosphere, and release back into space. There is an average of 340.4 watts/m^{2} of incoming energy. To maintain a stable climate the same amount of energy must return to space. While increased levels of greenhouse gasses retain more heat, there are other pathways that can influence this energy balance. Understanding these dynamics provides more pathways to moderate the climate than simply relying on emissions reductions and sequestration alone. Referencing the NASA earth's energy budget, an example is reducing the 398.2 watts/m^{2} emitted by the surface, by extending terrestrial and marine vegetative cover as a percentage of land cover and by extending the length of seasonal growth. This is achieved through a whole system approach including regenerating the soil carbon sponge, protection of existing forests, reafforestation, and restoring the biotic pump. The heat emitted from the planet (398.2 watts/m^{2}) is greater than incoming solar energy (340.4 watts/m^{2}).

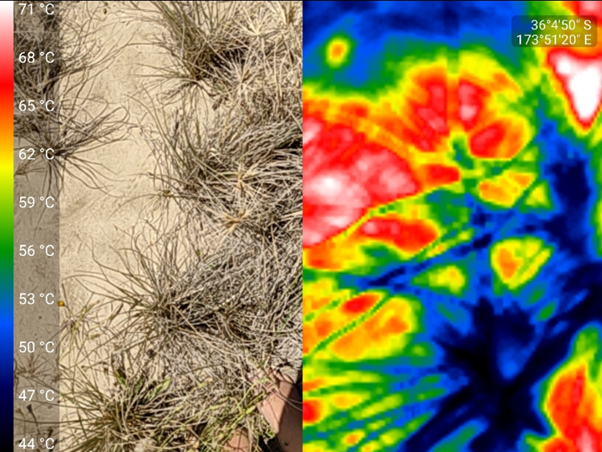
Thermal image of spinifex showing a 27 degree C. temperature difference

== Indigenous stewardship for climate moderation ==
Increasing vegetative cover will be enhanced by protecting indigenous rights. Deforestation is an expression of the extractive industries of colonisation. Recent scholarship has identified that indigenous communities in Australia and North America maintained landscapes to reduce the incidence of uncontrolled forest fire and maintain biodiversity. A study of 12,000 years of population data found that "three quarters of terrestrial nature has long been shaped by diverse histories of human habitation and use by Indigenous and traditional peoples".

With rare exceptions, current biodiversity losses are caused not by human conversion or degradation of untouched ecosystems, but rather by the appropriation, colonization, and intensification of use in lands inhabited and used by prior societies.

This calls on us to unlearn some of the assumptions embedded in Western epistemologies and the decolonisation of knowledge as a foundation for more effective climate action.

== See also ==
- Effects of climate change on the water cycle
- Water cycle
