= Soil carbon sponge =

Soil carbon sponge (or soil sponge) is porous, well-aggregated soil in good health, better able to absorb and retain water. Australian microbiologist and climatologist, Walter Jehne, articulated the concept of the soil carbon sponge in his 2017 paper, Regenerate Earth, connecting soil carbon with a restored water cycle able to induce planetary cooling through evaporative cooling and higher reflectance of denser green vegetation. Cooling from increased cloud formation is another benefit of soil regeneration anticipated by Jehne.

A soil carbon sponge has densities much lighter (1 gram/cc) as compared to the parent mineral soil (2.6–3.5 grams/cc).

Intensive farming practices that leave bare soils, cultivate extensively, apply water-needy fertilizers and biocides and extensively irrigate have accelerated the oxidation of soil carbon as CO_{2}. These oxidative practices reduce the depth and function of soil carbon sponges. Soil carbon sponges can be negatively affected by fire and flooding.

== Global scale ==
It has been postulated that improved performance of soil carbon sponges at a global scale, could affect the Earth's climate mainly through ecohydrology. Soil carbon sponges also serve as carbon sinks. Afforestation, reforestation and cover cropping are methods to build and improve soil carbon sponges. Afforestation provides environmental benefits, including increasing the soil quality and organic carbon levels in the soil, avoiding erosion and desertification.

Observational evidence, that the southern Amazon rainforest triggers its own rainy season using water vapor from plant leaves, which then forms clouds above it has been reported. Airborne bacteria released from the plant leaves may seed these clouds, which result in rain droplet formations. These findings may explain why deforestation affects the soil carbon sponge and links it to reduced rainfall.

== See also ==
- Biogeochemistry
- Biotic pump
- Carbon cycle
- Carbon farming
- Climate change mitigation
- Climate-smart agriculture
- Cloud condensation nuclei
- Deforestation and climate change
- Ecological farming
- Hydraulic redistribution § Fungal associations
- Land use, land-use change, and forestry
- Mycorrhizal fungi and soil carbon storage
- Reconciliation ecology
- Regenerative agriculture
- Root mucilage
- Soil biomantle
- Soil carbon feedback
- Soil compaction (agriculture)
- Soil erosion
- Soil moisture
- Soil organic matter
- Soil quality
- Soil retrogression and degradation
- Sustainable agriculture
- Tillage erosion
- Topsoil
- Transpiration stream
- Water content
