= Potometer =

Device for measuring water uptake in plants

Drawing of a Potometer

A potometer' (from Greek ποτό = drunken, and μέτρο = measure), sometimes known as transpirometer, is a device used for measuring the rate of water uptake of a leafy shoot which is almost equal to the water lost through transpiration. The causes of water uptake are photosynthesis and transpiration.

The rate of transpiration can be estimated in two ways:

1. Indirectly - by measuring the distance the water level drops in the graduated tube over a measured length of time. It is assumed that this is due to the cutting taking in water which in turn is necessary to replace an equal volume of water lost by transpiration.
2. Directly - by measuring the reduction in mass of the potometer over a period of time. Here it is assumed that any loss in mass is due to transpiration.

There are two main types of potometers: the bubble potometer (as detailed below), and the mass potometer. The mass potometer consists of a plant with its root submerged in a beaker. This beaker is then placed on a digital balance; readings can be made to determine the amount of water lost by the plant.

== Design ==
Potometers come in a variety of designs, but all follow the same basic principle.

- A length of capillary tube. A bubble is introduced to the capillary; as water is taken up by the plant, the bubble moves. By marking regular gradations on the tube, it is possible to measure water uptake.
- A reservoir. Typically a funnel with a tap; turning the tap on the reservoir resets the bubble. Some designs use a syringe instead.
- A tube for holding the shoot. The shoot must be held in contact with the water; additionally, the surface of the water should not be exposed to the air. Otherwise, evaporation will interfere with measurements. A rubber bung greased with petroleum jelly suffices.

== Preparation ==
- Cut a leafy shoot for a plant and plunge its base into water. This prevents the xylem from taking up any air. Wetting the leaves themselves will alter the rate of transpiration.
- Immerse the whole of the potometer into the sink. Move it about until all the air bubbles come out.
- Recut the shoot's stem underwater. Put it into the bung; grease the bung with plenty of petroleum jelly if it doesn't stay and then put the bung into the potometer.
- Make sure the tap is closed, then lift the whole assembly out of the water.
- Leave the end of the capillary tube out of the water until an air bubble forms, then put the end into a beaker of water.

== Types of potometers ==
- Farmer's potometer(used to measure the intake of water by plants)
- Garreau's potometer(Demonstrate the unequal transpiration from the two surfaces of a dorsiventral leaf)
- Ganong's potometer(used to measure the intake of water by plants)
- Darwin's potometer(Demonstrate the suction force created due to transpiration)

== Use ==
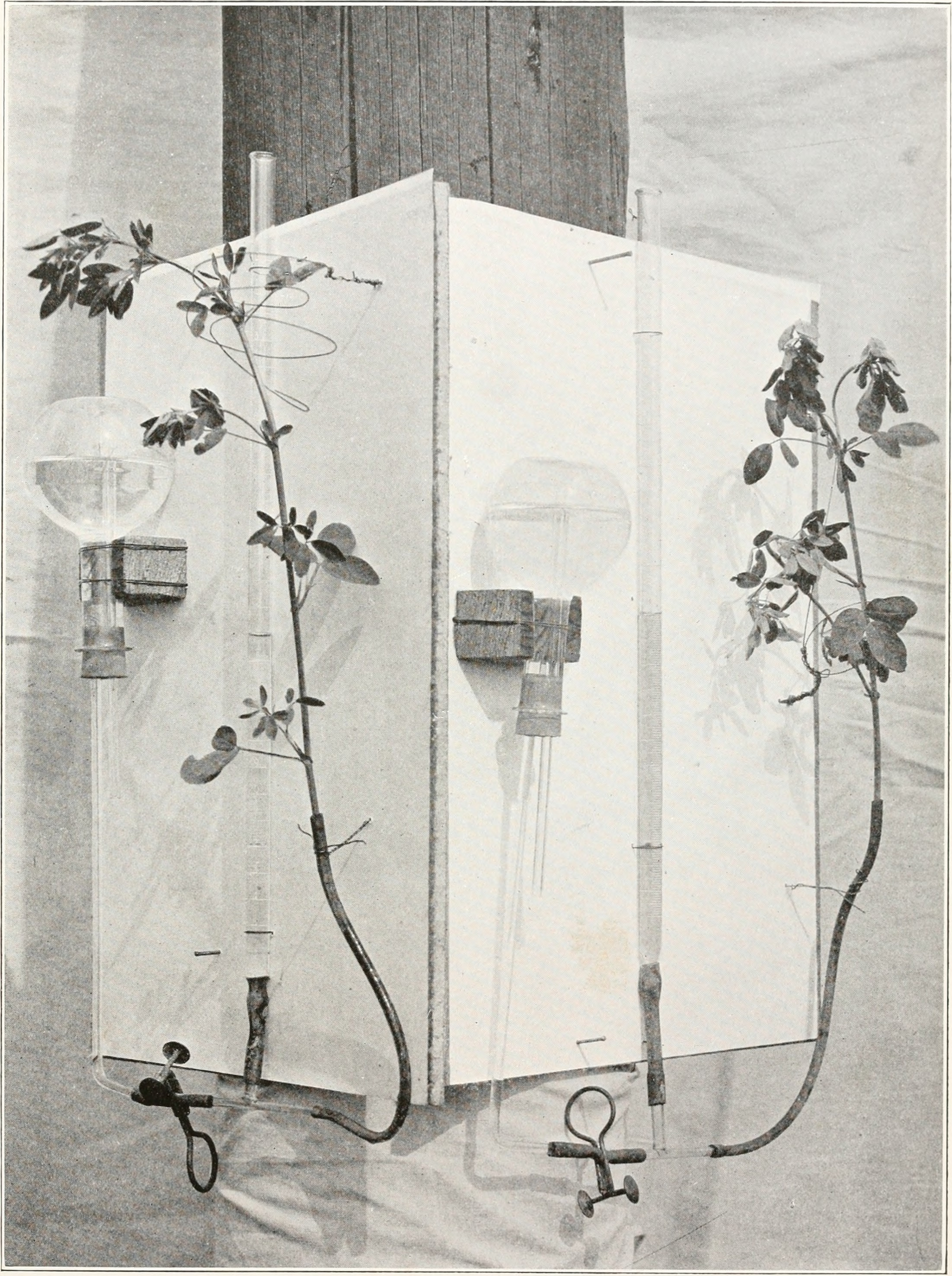
Potometer in use in the 1920s

measuring the rate of water uptake of a leafy shoot which is almost equal to the water lost through transpiration..

== Precautions ==
When a twig is cut from a plant, it should be immediately put under water (only the cut portion). Then, a small part is cut under water. This prevents entry of air into the xylem vessels.

The conditions of the potometer, other than the alteration that is being tested, should not be changed during a test, as outside conditions (such as temperature) determine water uptake.

Everything must be completely watertight so that no leakage occurs.

== Limitations ==
A potometer measures rate of water uptake, which is distinct from transpiration itself. This is because not all of the water that is taken by the plant is used for transpiration (water taken might be used for photosynthesis or by the cells to maintain turgidity). To measure transpiration rate directly, rather than the rate of water uptake, utilize a scientific instrument which quantifies water transfer at the leaves. However, in general the water retained by the plant is so minute that it can be neglected.
