= Photosynthesis system =

Instruments measuring photosynthetic rates

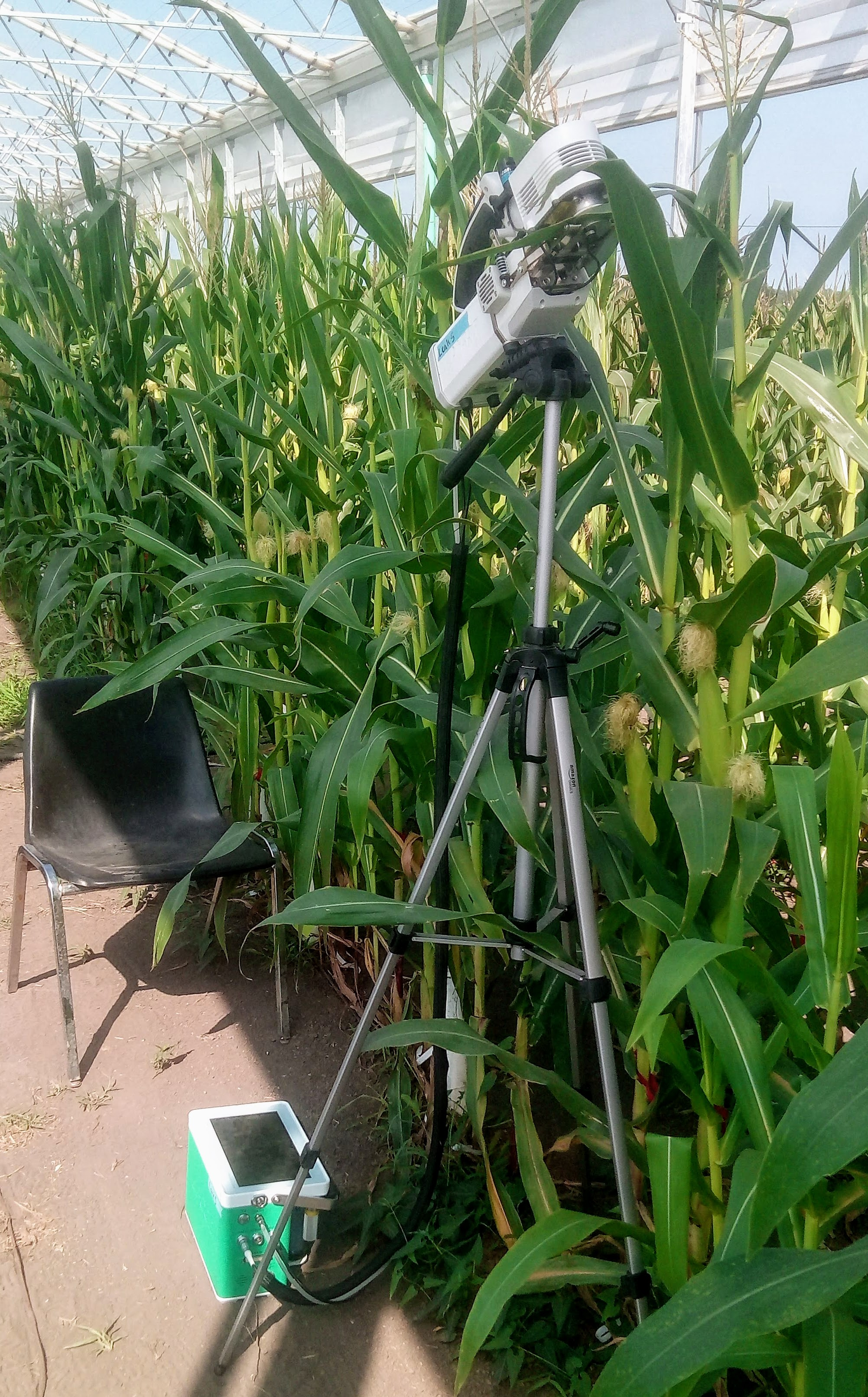
A photosynthesis system analysing the photosynthetic rate of a maize leaf

Photosynthesis systems are electronic scientific instruments designed for non-destructive measurement of photosynthetic rates in the field. Photosynthesis systems are commonly used in agronomic and environmental research, as well as studies of the global carbon cycle.

== How photosynthesis systems function ==
Photosynthesis systems function by measuring gas exchange of leaves. Atmospheric carbon dioxide is taken up by leaves in the process of photosynthesis, where CO_{2} is used to generate sugars in a molecular pathway known as the Calvin cycle. This draw-down of CO_{2} induces more atmospheric CO_{2} to diffuse through stomata into the air spaces of the leaf. While stoma are open, water vapor can easily diffuse out of plant tissues, a process known as transpiration. It is this exchange of CO_{2} and water vapor that is measured as a proxy of photosynthetic rate.

The basic components of a photosynthetic system are the leaf chamber, infrared gas analyzer (IRGA), batteries and a console with keyboard, display and memory. Modern 'open system' photosynthesis systems also incorporate miniature disposable compressed gas cylinder and gas supply pipes. This is because external air has natural fluctuations in CO_{2} and water vapor content, which can introduce measurement noise. Modern 'open system' photosynthesis systems remove the CO_{2} and water vapour by passage over soda lime and Drierite, then add CO_{2} at a controlled rate to give a stable CO_{2} concentration. Some systems are also equipped with temperature control and a removable light unit, so the effect of these environmental variables can also be measured.

The leaf to be analysed is placed in the leaf chamber. The CO_{2} concentrations is measured by the infrared gas analyzer. The IRGA shines infrared light through a gas sample onto a detector. CO_{2} in the sample absorbs energy, so the reduction in the level of energy that reaches the detector indicates the CO_{2} concentration. Modern IRGAs take account of the fact that H_{2}O absorbs energy at similar wavelengths as CO_{2}. Modern IRGAs may either dry the gas sample to a constant water content or incorporate both a CO_{2} and a water vapour IRGA to assess the difference in CO_{2} and water vapour concentrations in air between the chamber entrance and outlet.

The Liquid Crystal Display on the console displays measured and calculated data. The console may have a PC card slot. The stored data can be viewed on the LCD, or sent to a PC. Some photosynthesis systems allow communication over the internet using standard internet communication protocols.

Modern photosynthetic systems may also be designed to measure leaf temperature, chamber air temperature, PAR (photosynthetically active radiation), and atmospheric pressure. These systems may calculate water use efficiency (A/E), stomatal conductance (gs), intrinsic water use efficiency (A/gs), and sub-stomatal CO_{2} concentration (Ci). Chamber and leaf temperatures are measured with a thermistor sensor. Some systems are also designed to control environmental conditions.

A simple and general equation for Photosynthesis is: CO_{2}+ H_{2}O+ (Light Energy)→ C_{6}H_{12}O_{6}+O_{2}

== 'Open' systems or 'closed' systems ==
There are two distinct types of photosynthetic system; ‘open’ or ‘closed’. This distinction refers to whether or not the atmosphere of the leaf-enclosing chamber is renewed during the measurement.

In an ‘open system’, air is continuously passed through the leaf chamber to maintain CO_{2} in the leaf chamber at a steady concentration. The leaf to be analysed is placed in the leaf chamber. The main console supplies the chamber with air at a known rate with a known concentration of CO_{2} and H_{2}O. The air is directed over the leaf, then the CO_{2} and H_{2}O concentration of air leaving the chamber is determined. The out going air will have a lower CO_{2} concentration and a higher H_{2}O concentration than the air entering the chamber. The rate of CO_{2} uptake is used to assess the rate of photosynthetic carbon assimilation, while the rate of water loss is used to assess the rate of transpiration. Since CO_{2} intake and H_{2}O release both occur through the stomata, high rates of CO_{2} uptake are expected to coincide with high rates of transpiration. High rates of CO_{2} uptake and H_{2}O loss indicates high stomatal conductance.

Because the atmosphere is renewed, 'open' systems are not seriously affected by outward gas leakage and adsorption or absorption by the materials of the system.

In contrast, in a ‘closed system’, the same atmosphere is continuously measured over a period of time to establish rates of change in the parameters. The CO_{2} concentration in the chamber is decreased, while the H_{2}O concentration increases. This is less tolerant to leakage and material ad/absorption.

== Calculating photosynthetic rate and related parameters ==
=== Calculations used in 'open system' systems; ===
For CO_{2} to diffuse into the leaf, stomata must be open, which permits the outward diffusion of water vapour. Therefore, the conductance of stomata influences both photosynthetic rate (A) and transpiration (E), and the usefulness of measuring A is enhanced by the simultaneous measurement of E. The internal CO_{2} concentration (C_{i}) is also quantified, since C_{i} represents an indicator of the availability of the primary substrate (CO_{2}) for A.

A carbon assimilation is determined by measuring the rate at which the leaf assimilates CO_{2} . The change in CO_{2} is calculated as CO_{2} flowing into leaf chamber, in μmol mol^{−1} CO_{2}, minus flowing out from leaf chamber, in μmol mol^{−1}. The photosynthetic rate (Rate of CO_{2} exchange in the leaf chamber) is the difference in CO_{2} concentration through chamber, adjusted for the molar flow of air per m^{2} of leaf area, mol m^{−2} s^{−1}.

The change in H_{2}O vapour pressure is water vapour pressure out of leaf chamber, in mbar, minus the water vapour pressure into leaf chamber, in mbar. Transpiration rate is differential water vapour concentration, mbar, multiplied by the flow of air into leaf chamber per square meter of leaf area, mol s^{−1} m^{−2}, divided by atmospheric pressure, in mBar.

=== Calculations used in 'closed system' systems; ===
A leaf is placed in the leaf-chamber, with a known area of leaf enclosed. Once the chamber is closed, carbon dioxide concentration gradually declines. When the concentration decreases past a certain point a timer is started, and is stopped as the concentration passes at a second point. The difference between these concentrations gives the change in carbon dioxide in ppm. Net photosynthetic rate in micro grams carbon dioxide s^{−1} is given by;

(V • p • 0.5 • FSD • 99.7) / t

where V = the chamber volume in liters, p = the density of carbon dioxide in mg cm^{−3}, FSD = the carbon dioxide concentration in ppm corresponding to the change in carbon dioxide in the chamber, t = the time in seconds for the concentration to decrease by the set amount. Net photosynthesis per unit leaf area is derived by dividing net photosynthetic rate by the leaf area enclosed by the chamber.

== Applications ==
Since photosynthesis, transpiration and stomatal conductance are an integral part of basic plant physiology, estimates of these parameters can be used to investigate numerous aspects of plant biology. The plant-scientific community has generally accepted photosynthetic systems as reliable and accurate tools to assist research. There are numerous peer-reviewed articles in scientific journals which have used a photosynthetic system. To illustrate the utility and diversity of applications of photosynthetic systems, below you will find brief descriptions of research using photosynthetic systems;

- Researchers from the Technion - Israel Institute of Technology and a number of US institutions studied the combined effects of drought and heat stress on Arabidopsis thaliana. Their research suggests that the combined effects of heat and drought stress cause sucrose to serve as the major osmoprotectant.
- Plant physiologists from The University of Putra Malaysia and The University of Edinburgh investigated the relative effects of tree age and tree size on the physiological attributes of two broadleaf species. A photosynthetic system was used to measure photosynthetic rate per unit of leaf mass.
- Researchers at University of California-Berkeley found that water loss from leaves in Sequoia sempervirens is ameliorated by heavy fog in the Western US. Their research suggests that fog may help the leaves retain water and enable the trees to fix more carbon during active growth periods.
- The effect of CO_{2} enrichment on the photosynthetic behavior of an endangered medicinal herb was investigated by this team at Garhwal University, India. Photosynthetic rate (A) was stimulated during the first 30 days, then significantly decreased. Transpiration rate (E) decreased significantly throughout the CO_{2} enrichment, whereas stomatal conductance (gs) significantly reduced initially. Overall, it was concluded that the medicinally important part of this plant showed increased growth.
- Researchers at the University of Trás-os-Montes and Alto Douro, Portugal grew Grapevines in outside plots and in Open-Top Chambers which elevated the level of CO_{2}. A photosynthetic system was used to measure CO_{2} assimilation rate (A), stomatal conductance (gs), transpiration rate (E), and internal CO_{2} concentration/ambient CO_{2} ratio (Ci/Ca). The environmental conditions inside the chambers caused a significant reduction in yield.
- A study of Nickel bioremediation involving poplar (Populas nigra), conducted by researchers at the Bulgarian Academy of Sciences and the National Research Institute of Italy (Consiglio Nazionale delle Ricerche), found that Ni-induced stress reduced photosynthesis rates, and that this effect was dependent upon leaf Ni content. In mature leaves, Ni stress led to emission of cis-β-ocimene, whereas in developing leaves, it led to enhanced isoprene emissions.
- Plant physiologists in Beijing measured photosynthetic rate, transpiration rate and stomatal conductance in plants which accumulate metal and those that do not accumulate metal. Seedlings were grown in the presence of 200 or 400 μM CdCl_{2}. This was used to elucidate the role of antioxidative enzyme in the adaptive responses of metal-accumulators and non-accumulators to Cadmium stress.
- In a study of drought resistance and salt tolerance of a rice variety, researchers at the National Center of Plant Gene Research and the Huazhong Agricultural University in Wuhan, China found that a transgenic rice variety showed greater drought resistance than a conventional variety. Over expression of the stress response gene SNAC1 led to reduced water loss, but no significant change in photosynthetic rate.
- This Canadian team examined the dynamic responses of Stomatal conductance (gs) net photosynthesis (A) to a progressive drought in nine poplar clones with contrasting drought tolerance. gs and A were measured using a photosynthetic system. Plants were either well-watered or drought preconditioned.
- Researchers at Banaras Hindu University, India, investigated the potential of sewage sludge to be used in agriculture as an alternative disposal technique. Agricultural soil growing rice had sewage sludge added at different rates. Rates of photosynthesis and stomatal conductance of the rice were measured to examine the biochemical and physiological responses of sewage addition.
- Researchers from Lancaster University, The University of Liverpool, and The University of Essex, UK, measured isoprene emission rates from an oil palm tree. Samples were collected using a photosynthetic system that controlled PAR and leaf temperature (1000 μmol m^{−2} s^{−1}; 30 °C). It had thought that PAR and temperature are the main controls of isoprene emission from the biosphere. This research showed that isoprene emissions from oil palm tree are under strong circadian control.
- The ecophysiological diversity and the breeding potential of wild coffee populations in Ethiopia was evaluated as a thesis submitted to The Rheinischen Friedrich-Wilhelms-University of Bonn, Germany. Complementary field and garden studies of populations native to a range of climatic conditions were examined. Plant ecophysiological behavior was assessed by a number of system parameters, including gas exchange, which was measured using a photosynthetic system.
- A collaborative project between researchers at the University of Cambridge, UK, the Australian Research Council Center of Excellence, and the Australian National University resulted in validation of a model that describes carbon isotope discrimination for crassulacean acid metabolism using Kalanchoe daigremontiana.
- Instruments of this type can also be used as a standard for plant stress measurement. Difficult to measure types of plant stress such as Cold stress, and water stress can be measured with this type of instrumentation.
