= Canopy conductance =

Dimensionless quantity

Canopy conductance, commonly denoted $g_c$, is a dimensionless quantity characterizing radiation distribution in tree canopy. By definition, it is calculated as a ratio of daily water use to daily mean vapor pressure deficit (VPD). Canopy conductance can be also experimentally obtained by measuring sap flow and environmental variables. Stomatal conductance may be used as a reference value to validate the data, by summing the total stomatal conductance $g_s$ of all leaf classes within the canopy.

$g_c = \sum_{layer_1}^{layer_N} (g^i_{s,sun} \cdot l_{sun}^i) + (g_{s,shade} \cdot l_{shade})$

== See also ==
- Ecohydrology
- Stomatal conductance
- Transpiration
