= Biotic pump =

Theory of how forests affect rainfall

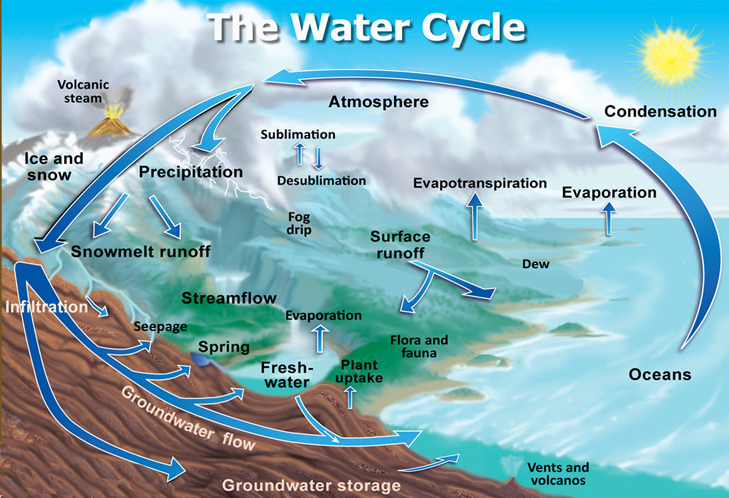
The biotic pump theory may be able to help us better understand the role forests have on the water cycle.

The biotic pump is a theoretical concept that shows how forests create and control winds coming up from the ocean and in doing so bring water to the forests further inland.

This theory could explain the role forests play in the water cycle: trees take up water from the soil and microscopic pores on the leaves release unused water as vapor into the air. This process is known as evapotranspiration. The biotic pump describes how water vapor given off by trees can drive winds and these winds can cross continents and deliver this moisture to far off forests. With this process and the fact that the foliage in forests have surface area, the forests can deliver more moisture to the atmosphere than evaporation from a body of water or equivalent size. Critics of the theory argue that differential heating is sufficient to explain the phenomenon, and that the biotic pump effect is relatively weak.

The biotic pump hypothesis demonstrates how important our rainforests are to the surrounding ecosystem. Rainforests are susceptible to anthropogenic factors (ie. deforestation), which could impact the biotic pump; therefore, impacting other ecosystems that rely on the biotic pump to thrive. Without our rainforests the weather would be less stable and rain could decrease in regions that rely on the biotic pump for water. Additionally, we can gain further insight into the evolution of angiosperms, as well as the correlation between ecology and the interior watering of the continents. By 2022 the concept had been more widely articulated and linked to the importance of stopping deforestation, restoring the hydrological cycle and planetary cooling.

== Concept ==
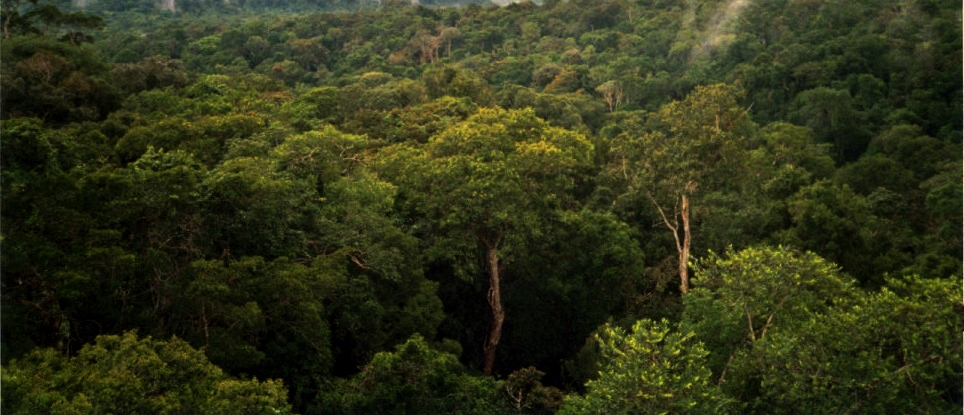
View of Amazon basin forest north of Manaus, Brazil.

The term “biotic pump” infers a circulation system driven by biological processes. This concept shows forests as being the major factors in manipulating atmospheric processes to cycle rainfall taken up by trees throughout all continents and back to the atmosphere for further cycling. Evapotranspiration in coastal forests creates low atmospheric pressure creating a suction effect to draw in water vapor from the ocean. Prior to the biotic pump theory, trees were thought to have a passive role in the water cycle. By contrast those developing the biotic pump concept state that “forest and trees are prime regulators within the water, energy and carbon cycles.” In areas were there is more rain is currently being evaporated (on land versus over the ocean), the atmospheric volume decreases at a much quicker rater. This causes low pressure to form over this region causing greater moist air than the areas with less rain being evaporated. This causes the moisture in the air to go from an area of high pressure to an area of low pressure. Factors like full sunshine in forested areas and deserts can affect the transfer of moisture in the air. Increased amounts of evaporation or transpiration will cause a reduction in atmospheric pressure as clouds form, which will subsequently cause moist air to be drawn to regions where evapotranspiration is at its highest. In a desert this will correspond to the sea whereas in a forest, moist air from the sea will be drawn inland. The theory predicts two different types of coast to continental rainfall patterns, first in a forested area one can expect no decrease in rainfall as one moves inland in contrast to a deforested region where one observes an exponential decrease in annual rainfall. While current global climate models fit these patterns well, it is argued this is due to parametrization and not the veracity of the theories.

== Development of the theory ==
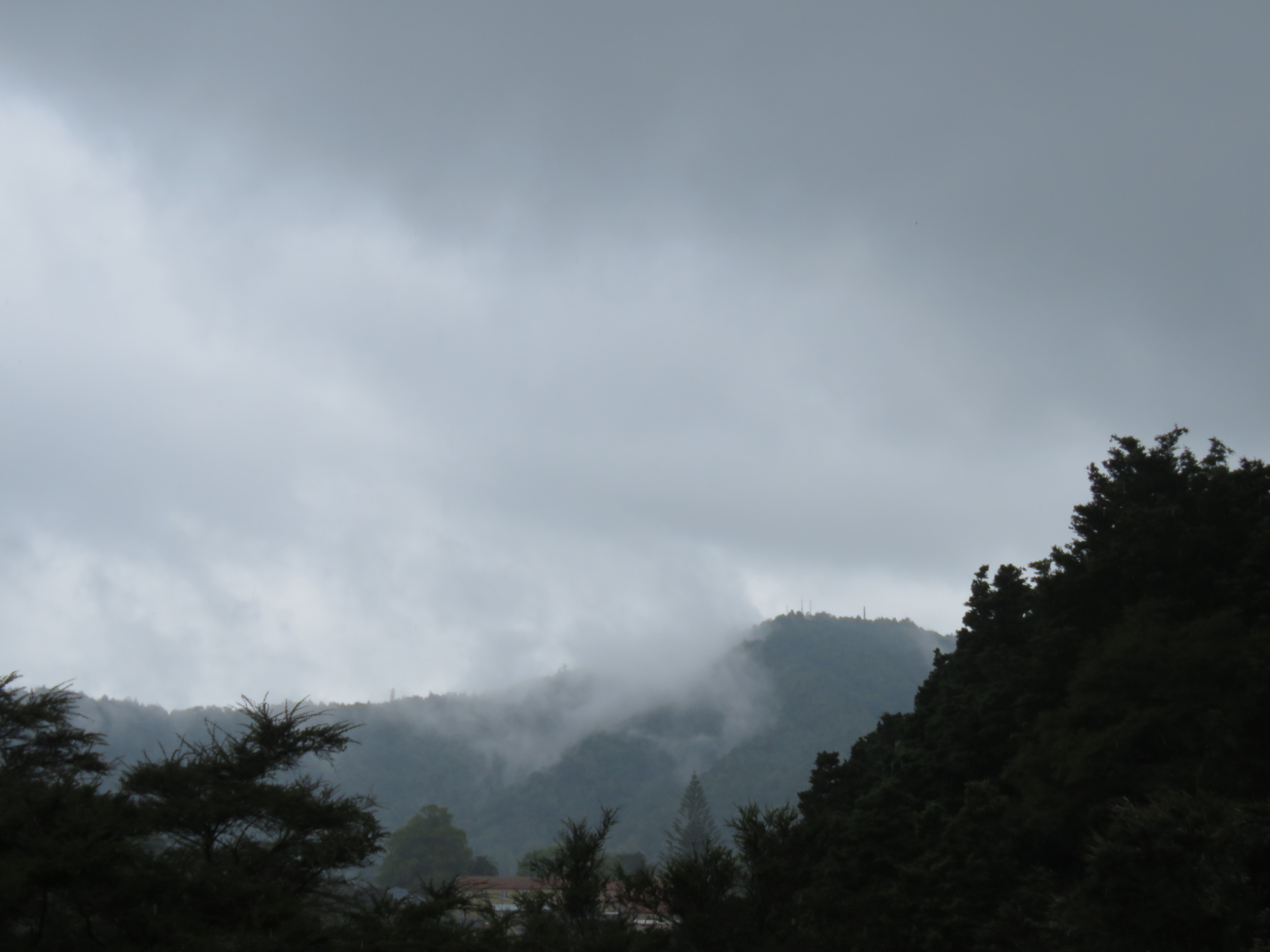
Atmospheric moisture flows around and through indigenous forest in Whangārei, Aotearoa (New Zealand)

The biotic pump theory was developed by scientists Anastassia Makarieva and the late Victor Gorshov, who were Russian theoretical physicists working for the Theoretical Physics Division of the Petersberg Nuclear Physics Institute. Dr. Makarieva spent time recreationally and professionally in Russia's northern forests, the largest expanse of trees on the planet. She claims the conventional understanding that winds are driven by differences in air temperature does not fully explain the dynamics of wind, and came to understand that the pressure drop caused by water vapor turning into water was a more accurate model. Her initial studies were largely ignored and criticized.

The theory represents a paradigm shift away from a geo-mechanical view of climate dynamics to include biology as a driver of climate. As such the theory has faced criticism from mainstream climate sciences. Fred Pearce attributes this as being partly cultural. “Science, as I know from forty years of reporting, can be surprisingly tribal. Makarieva and Gorshkov have been outsiders: theoretical physicists in a world of climate science, Russians in a field dominated by Western scientists, and, in Makarieva’s case, a woman too”.

There are thought to be four terrestrial moisture recycling hubs, the Amazon Basin, the Congo Rainforest, South Asia and the Indonesian Archipelago. In particular, the hydrological dynamics of the Amazon Basin are still unclear, but point to the veracity of the biotic pump hypothesis. These processes contribute to a “safe operating space for humanity”. Additionally, the biotic pump theory can help explain other natural occurrences around the world. For example, the biotic pump can help explain why rainforests such as the Amazon and Congo are able to maintain high rainfall while other unforested biomes decrease in rainfall, as you get further inland.

Atmospheric (or flying) rivers, formerly called tropospheric rivers, are winds that pick up water vapor given off by forests and take the moisture to distant water basins. These rivers are enhanced by the biotic pump over large distances. The atmospheric river that flows over the Amazon travels south to provide the River Plate Basin with 50% of its rain. China's north-western rivers receive more than 70% of their precipitation from Euro and Northern Asia. By 2022, this concept had become widely accepted.

== How the biotic pump drives hydrological processes ==
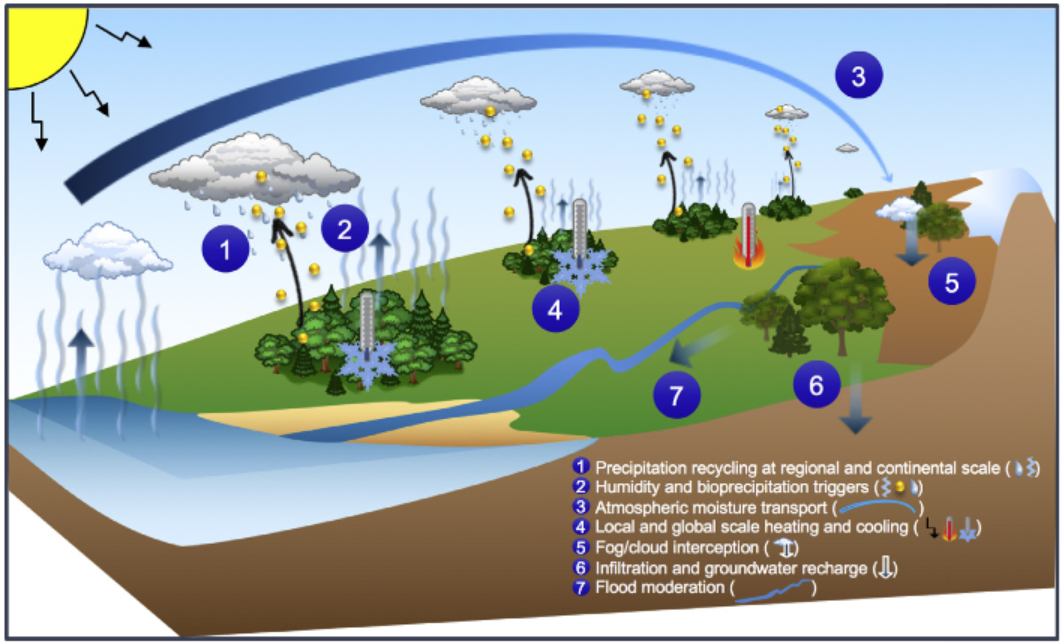
The hydrological dynamics of the biotic pump.

1. The cycle begins when precipitation from the ocean is recycled through landscapes by cycles of precipitation and evapotranspiration. Through transpiration and condensation forests create low pressure that draw moist air from the ocean.
2. Transpiration and evaporation cycle water back into the atmosphere alongside microbes and volatile organic compounds (VOCs). Airborne microbes nucleate rain.
3. Biologically induced air currents transport atmospheric moisture further inland.
4. By providing rainfall vegetation is able to survive and possibly flourish perpetuating forest cover. The forested areas have a more moderate climate through the provision of transpirational cooling and shade. Light penetrating through to the forest floor may be as little as 1% compared to cleared adjacent areas. In areas where more cleared land is exposed conversion of radiant energy to sensible heat increases. Forested areas are significantly cooler than sparsely vegetated or bare earth.
5. Trees harvest water by intercepting fog and humid air. Atmospheric humidity condenses on leaves and branches. Biomimicry of this process happens with the use of fog nets.
6. Tree canopies slow the progression of rain to the soil surface and soften the impact. Additionally, through the provision of organic matter and the export of carbon through roots to the mycorrhizal network create soil carbon, enhancing soil structure for the infiltration and storage of water.
7. Soils with enhanced infiltration and storage rates mitigate flood impacts. This is further enhanced by forest cover protecting soil from erosion. Water infiltrated into the soil can help to replenish aquifers.

== Connection with hydrological cycle and climate moderation ==
Of the estimated six trillion trees on the planet, roughly three trillion remain. Along with other terrestrial and marine vegetation, they photosynthesize sugars providing a foundational ingredient of life and growth. This process also produces oxygen and removes carbon dioxide from the air. Trees also provide food and timber, and foster biodiversity. Additionally, forested lands provide ample water for human and animal life, especially in the aptly-named rainforest.

By contrast, drylands comprise approximately 41% of the Earth's land area and are home to two billion people. These are fragile ecosystems. Adverse weather patterns and pressure from human activity can quickly deplete water resources.

Revegetation projects are yielding evidence of how regenerating vegetation restores rainfall. Rajendra Singh, the Waterman of India, led a movement that restored several rivers in Rhajastan increasing vegetation cover from 2% to 48%, cooling the region by 2^{o} Celsius, and increasing rainfall.^{,} Africa's Great Green Wall project was 15% complete in 2022. Modelling suggests that the completed wall may decrease average temperatures in the Sahel by as much as 1.5^{o} Celsius, but may raise temperatures in the hottest areas. Rainfall would increase, even doubling in some areas. China also has a 4,500 km Great Green Wall project planted to stop the advancing Gobi Desert.

The phrase bio-rain corridor describes a connected area of forest that maintains the flow of atmospheric moisture and precipitation. Continued deforestation poses the risk of disrupting flows of atmospheric moisture. In 2022 there were processes being developed to model the biotic pump mechanism to determine the impact of deforestation and the impacts of discontinuity of forest on atmospheric moisture flows.

There is great need to further understand these dynamics “Forest-driven water and energy cycles are poorly integrated into regional, national, continental and global decision-making on climate change adaptation, mitigation, land use and water management. This constrains humanity’s ability to protect our planet’s climate and life-sustaining functions.”

== See also ==
- Biological pump
- Evapotranspiration
