= Guard cell =

Paired cells that control the stomatal aperture

Opening and closing of stoma

Guard cells are specialized cells in the epidermis of leaves, stems and other organs of land plants that are used to control gas exchange between the plant and air. They are produced in pairs with a gap between them that forms a stomatal pore. The stomatal pores are largest when water is freely available and the guard cells become turgid, and closed when water availability is critically low and the guard cells become flaccid. Photosynthesis depends on the diffusion of carbon dioxide (CO_{2}) from the air through the stomata into the mesophyll tissues. Oxygen (O_{2}), produced as a byproduct of photosynthesis, exits the plant via the stomata. When the stomata are open, water is lost by evaporation and must be replaced via the transpiration stream, with water taken up by the roots. Plants must balance the amount of CO_{2} absorbed from the air with the water loss through the stomatal pores, and this is achieved by both active and passive control of guard cell turgor pressure and stomatal pore size.

== Guard cell function ==
Guard cells are cells surrounding each stoma. They help to regulate the rate of transpiration by opening and closing the stomata. Light is the main trigger for the opening or closing. Guard cells are bean-shaped, with a thicker inner side (i.e. the side closest to the pore) and a thinner outer side As water enters the cell, the thin side bulges outward more than the thicker side does. Thus the guard cell bends outwards and the stoma opens.

Guard cells contain phototropin proteins which are serine and threonine kinases with blue-light photoreceptor activity. Phototrophins contain two light, oxygen, and voltage sensor (LOV) domains, and are part of the PAS domain superfamily. The phototropins trigger many responses such as phototropism, chloroplast movement and leaf expansion as well as stomatal opening. Not much was known about how these photoreceptors worked prior to around 1998. The mechanism by which phototropins work was elucidated through experiments with broad bean (Vicia faba). Immunodetection and far-western blotting showed blue light excites phototropin 1 and phototropin 2, causing protein phosphatase 1 to begin a phosphorylation cascade, which activates H^{+}-ATPase, a pump responsible for pumping H^{+} ions out of the cell. The phosphorylated H^{+}-ATPase allows the binding of a 14-3-3 protein to an autoinhibitory domain of the H^{+}-ATPase at the C terminus. Serine and threonine are then phosphorylated within the protein, which induces H^{+}-ATPase activity. The same experiment also found that upon phosphorylation, a 14-3-3 protein was bound to the phototropins before the H^{+}-ATPase had been phosphorylated. In a similar experiment, researchers concluded that the binding of 14-3-3 protein to the phosphorylation site is essential for the activation of plasma membrane H^{+}-ATPase activity. This was done by adding phosphopeptides such as P-950, which inhibits the binding of 14-3-3 protein, to phosphorylated H^{+}-ATPase and observing the amino acid sequence. As protons are being pumped out, a negative electrical potential was formed across the plasma membrane. This hyperpolarization of the membrane allowed the accumulation of charged potassium (K^{+}) ions and chloride (Cl^{−}) ions, which in turn, increases the solute concentration causing the water potential to decrease. The negative water potential allows for osmosis to occur in the guard cell, so that water enters, allowing the cell to become turgid.

Opening and closure of the stomatal pore is mediated by changes in the turgor pressure of the two guard cells. The turgor pressure of guard cells is controlled by movements of large quantities of ions and sugars into and out of the guard cells. Guard cells have cell walls of varying thickness(its inner region, adjacent to the stomatal pore is thicker and highly cutinized) and differently oriented cellulose microfibers, causing them to bend outward when they are turgid, which in turn, causes stomata to open. Stomata close when there is an osmotic loss of water, occurring from the loss of K^{+} to neighboring cells, mainly potassium (K^{+}) ions.

== Water loss and water use efficiency ==
Water stress (drought and salt stress) is one of the major environmental problems causing severe losses in agriculture and in nature. Drought tolerance of plants is mediated by several mechanisms that work together, including stabilizing and protecting the plant from damage caused by desiccation and also controlling how much water plants lose through the stomatal pores during drought. A plant hormone, abscisic acid (ABA), is produced in response to drought. A major type of ABA receptor has been identified. The plant hormone ABA causes the stomatal pores to close in response to drought, which reduces plant water loss via transpiration to the atmosphere and allows plants to avoid or slow down water loss during droughts. Since guard cells control water loss of plants, the investigation on how stomatal opening and closure is regulated could lead to the development of plants with improved avoidance or slowing of desiccation and better water use efficiency.

ABA is the trigger for the closure of the stomatal opening. To trigger this it activates the release of anions and potassium ions. This influx in anions causes a depolarization of the plasma membrane. This depolarization triggers potassium plus ions in the cell to leave the cell due to the unbalance in the membrane potential. This sudden change in ion concentrations causes the guard cell to shrink which causes the stomata to close which in turn decreases the amount of water lost. All this is a chain reaction according to his research. The increase in ABA causes there to be an increase in calcium ion concentration. Although at first, they thought it was a coincidence they later discovered that this calcium increase is important. They found Ca2+ ions are involved in anion channel activation, which allows for anions to flow into the guard cell. They also are involved in prohibiting proton ATPase from correcting and stopping the membrane from being depolarized. To support their hypothesis that calcium was responsible for all these changes in the cell they did an experiment where they used proteins that inhibited the calcium ions for being produced. If their assumption that calcium is important in these processes they'd see that with the inhibitors they'd see less of the following things. Their assumption was correct and when the inhibitors were used they saw that the proton ATPase worked better to balance the depolarization. They also found that the flow of anions into the guard cells were not as strong. This is important for getting ions to flow into the guard cell. These two things are crucial in causing the stomatal opening to close preventing water loss for the plant.

== Ion uptake and release ==
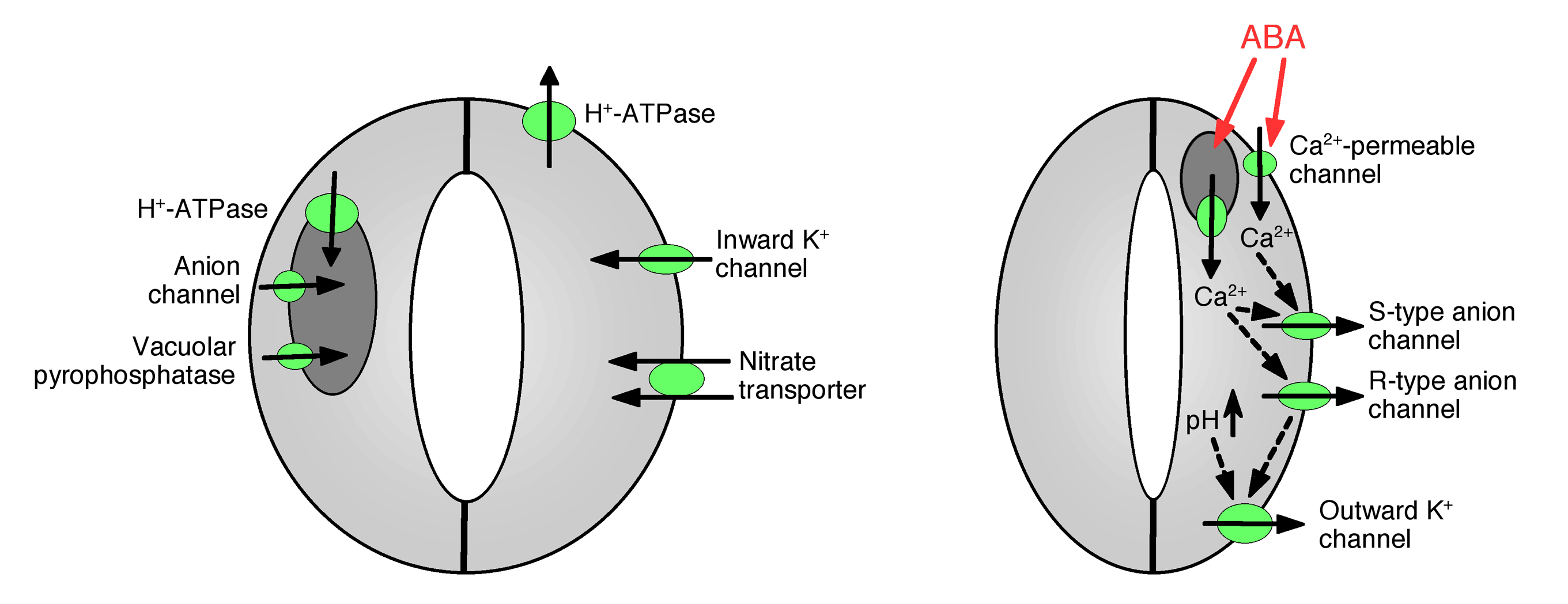
Ion channels and pumps regulating stomatal opening and closure.

Ion uptake into guard cells causes stomatal opening: The opening of gas exchange pores requires the uptake of potassium ions into guard cells. Potassium channels and pumps have been identified and shown to function in the uptake of ions and opening of stomatal apertures. Ion release from guard cells causes stomatal pore closing: Other ion channels have been identified that mediate release of ions from guard cells, which results in osmotic water efflux from guard cells due to osmosis, shrinking of the guard cells, and closing of stomatal pores (Figures 1 and 2). Specialized potassium efflux channels participate in mediating release of potassium from guard cells. Anion channels were identified as important controllers of stomatal closing. Anion channels have several major functions in controlling stomatal closing: (a) They allow release of anions, such as chloride and malate from guard cells, which is needed for stomatal closing. (b) Anion channels are activated by signals that cause stomatal closing, for example by intracellular calcium and ABA. The resulting release of negatively charged anions from guard cells results in an electrical shift of the membrane to more positive voltages (depolarization) at the intracellular surface of the guard cell plasma membrane. This electrical depolarization of guard cells leads to activation of the outward potassium channels and the release of potassium through these channels. At least two major types of anion channels have been characterized in the plasma membrane: S-type anion channels and R-type anion channels.

== Vacuolar ion transport ==
Vacuoles are large intracellular storage organelles in plants cells. In addition to the ion channels in the plasma membrane, vacuolar ion channels have important functions in regulation of stomatal opening and closure because vacuoles can occupy up to 90% of guard cell's volume. Therefore, a majority of ions are released from vacuoles when stomata are closed. Vacuolar K^{+} (VK) channels and fast vacuolar channels can mediate K^{+} release from vacuoles. Vacuolar K^{+} (VK) channels are activated by elevation in the intracellular calcium concentration. Another type of calcium-activated channel, is the slow vacuolar (SV) channel. SV channels have been shown to function as cation channels that are permeable to Ca^{2+} ions, but their exact functions are not yet known in plants.

Guard cells control gas exchange and ion exchange through opening and closing. K+ is one ion that flows both into and out of the cell, causing a positive charge to develop. Malate is one of the main anions used to counteract this positive charge, and it is moved through the AtALMT6 ion channel. AtALMT6 is an aluminum-activated malate transporter that is found in guard cells, specifically in the vacuoles. This transport channel was found to cause either an influx or efflux of malate depending on the concentrations of calcium. In a study by Meyer et al., patch-clamp experiments were conducted on mesophyll vacuoles from Arabidopsis rdr6-11 (WT) and Arabidopsis that were overexpressing AtALMT6-GFP. It was found from these experiments that in the WT there were only small currents when calcium ions were introduced, while in the AtALMT6-GFP mutant a huge inward rectifying current was observed. When the transporter is knocked out from guard cell vacuoles there is a significant reduction in malate flow current. The current goes from a huge inward current to not much different than the WT, and Meyer et al. hypothesized that this is due to residual malate concentrations in the vacuole. There is also a similar response in the knockout mutants to drought as in the WT. There was no phenotypic difference observed between the knockout mutants, the wild type, or the AtALMT6-GFP mutants, and the exact cause for this is not fully known.

== Signal transduction ==
Guard cells perceive and process environmental and endogenous stimuli such as light, humidity, CO_{2} concentration, temperature, drought, and plant hormones to trigger cellular responses resulting in stomatal opening or closure. These signal transduction pathways determine for example how quickly a plant will lose water during a drought period. Guard cells have become a model for single cell signaling. Using Arabidopsis thaliana, the investigation of signal processing in single guard cells has become open to the power of genetics. Cytosolic and nuclear proteins and chemical messengers that function in stomatal movements have been identified that mediate the transduction of environmental signals thus controlling CO_{2} intake into plants and plant water loss. Research on guard cell signal transduction mechanisms is producing an understanding of how plants can improve their response to drought stress by reducing plant water loss. Guard cells also provide an excellent model for basic studies on how a cell integrates numerous kinds of input signals to produce a response (stomatal opening or closing). These responses require coordination of numerous cell biological processes in guard cells, including signal reception, ion channel and pump regulation, membrane trafficking, transcription, cytoskeletal rearrangements and more. A challenge for future research is to assign the functions of some of the identified proteins to these diverse cell biological processes.

== Development ==
During the development of plant leaves, the specialized guard cells differentiate from "guard mother cells". The density of the stomatal pores in leaves is regulated by environmental signals, including increasing atmospheric CO_{2} concentration, which reduces the density of stomatal pores in the surface of leaves in many plant species by presently unknown mechanisms. The genetics of stomatal development can be directly studied by imaging of the leaf epidermis using a microscope. Several major control proteins that function in a pathway mediating the development of guard cells and the stomatal pores have been identified.
