= Stomatal conductance =

Rate of gas exchange and transpiration in plants

Stomatal conductance, usually measured in mmol m^{−2} s^{−1} by a porometer or similar device, estimates the rate of gas exchange (i.e., carbon dioxide assimilation or transpiration of water vapor) through the leaf stomata per unit difference in the mole fraction of carbon dioxide or water vapor, respectively, between the leaf's internal airspaces and the surrounding ambient atmosphere. Variation in stomatal conductance is driven primarily by variation in the width (aperture) of the stomatal pores and the number of stomata per unit leaf area (stomatal density), and to a lesser extent by variation in the depth of the stomatal pore; temperature also has a small direct effect, independent of these other factors.

The stomatal conductance, or its inverse, stomatal resistance, is under the direct biological control of the leaf through its guard cells, which surround the stomatal pore. The stomatal aperture, and therefore the conductance, is directly related to the turgor pressure of guard cells, which in turn is actively regulated by changes in the osmotic potential of guard cells.

Stomatal conductance is a function of stomatal density, stomatal aperture, and stomatal size. Stomatal conductance is integral to leaf level calculations of transpiration. Multiple studies have shown a direct correlation between the use of herbicides and changes in physiological and biochemical growth processes in plants, particularly non-target plants, resulting in a reduction in stomatal conductance and turgor pressure in leaves.

== Relation to stomatal opening ==
Stomatal conductance is a function of the density, size and degree of opening of the stomata; with more open stomata allowing greater conductance, and consequently indicating that photosynthesis and transpiration rates are potentially higher. Therefore, stomatal opening and closing has a direct relationship to stomatal conductance.

== Light-dependent stomatal opening ==
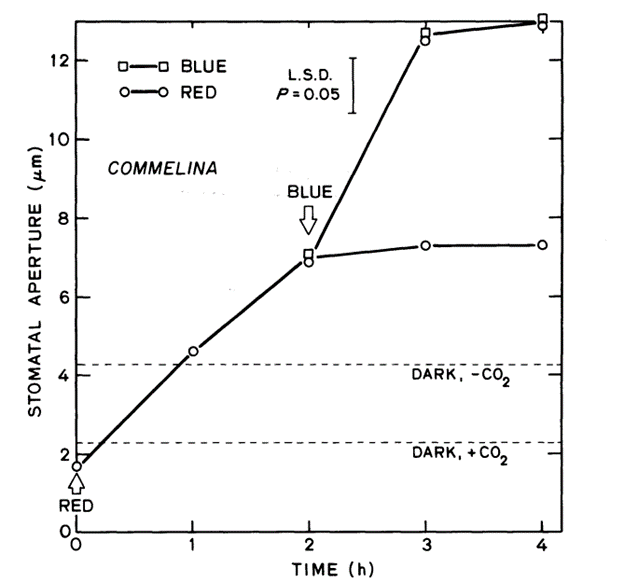
Figure 1. Dual-beam experiment with epidermal peels of Commelina. Peels were irradiated with 0.2 mmol m^{−2} s^{−1} of red light; 0.01 mmol m^{−2} s^{−1} of blue light was added as indicated by the arrow. Dashed lines at the bottom of figure = aperture values at the end of 4h incubation in darkness, under normal and CO_{2}-free air. The incubation media were aerated with CO_{2}-free air throughout the experiment. (Schwartz and Zieger, 1984)

Light-dependent stomatal opening occurs in many species and under many different conditions. Light is a major stimulus involved in stomatal conductance, and has two key elements that are involved in the process: 1) the stomatal response to blue light, and 2) photosynthesis in the chloroplast of the guard cell. In C3 and C4 plants, the stomata open when there is an increase in light, and they close when there is a decrease in light. In CAM plants, however, the stomata open when there is a decrease in light.

=== Stomatal response to blue light ===
Stomatal opening occurs as a response to blue light. Blue light activates the blue light receptor on the guard cell membrane which induces the pumping of protons out of the guard cell. This efflux of protons creates an electrochemical gradient that causes free floating potassium (K^{+}) and other ions to enter the guard cells via a channel. This increase in solutes within the guard cells leads to a decrease in the osmotic potential of the cells, resulting in a decrease in water potential. Then, because water flows from a system with higher water potential to a system with lower water potential, water floods into the guard cells, causing the guard cells to become enlarged and therefore causes the stomata to open.

Studies showed that stomata responded greatly to blue light, even when in a red-light background (see Figure 1). In one study, the experiment began once stomatal opening had reached its saturation in red-light. Then, when blue light was added, stomatal opening increased even further, showing that a different photoreceptor system, stimulated by blue light, mediates the additional increases in opening.

=== Photosynthesis in the chloroplast ===
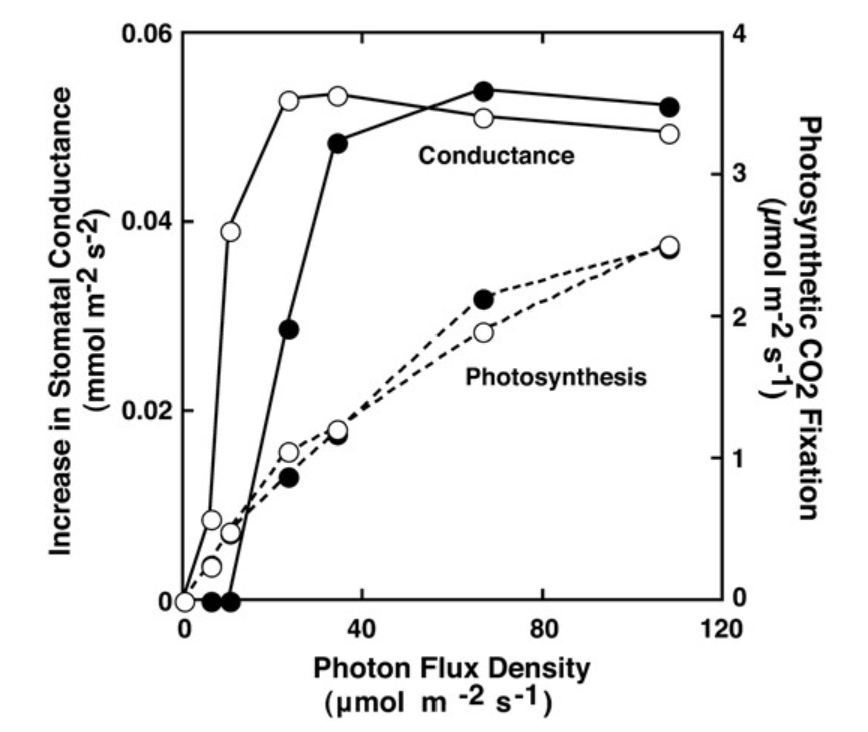
Figure 2. Dependencies of PFD for stomatal conductance increase and photosynthetic CO2 fixation. Solid and dotted lines represent the increase in stomatal conductance and photosynthetic CO2 fixation, respectively. Red light was irradiated onto the upper (black circles) or lower side (white circles) of the leaf. (Doi and Shimazaki 2008).

The second key element involved in light-dependent stomatal opening is photosynthesis in the chloroplast of the guard cell. In response to carbon dioxide (CO_{2}) entering the chloroplasts, photosynthesis occurs. This increases the amount of solutes that are being produced by the chloroplast which are then released into the cytosol of the guard cell. This causes a decrease in osmotic potential, causing a decrease in the water potential inside the guard cells. Again, this decrease in water potential causes water to enter into the guard cells. The guard cells subsequently swell up with water and the stomata is opened.

Recent studies have looked at the stomatal conductance of fast growing tree species to identify the water use of various species. Through their research it was concluded that the predawn water potential of the leaf remained consistent throughout the months while the midday water potential of the leaf showed a variation due to the seasons. For example, canopy stomatal conductance had a higher water potential in July than in October. The studies conducted for this experiment determined that the stomatal conductance allowed for a constant water use per unit leaf area.

Another study also showed that stomatal opening is dependent on guard cell photosynthesis. This was carried out by isolating guard cells that were localized to the lower surface of the Adiantum leaves used in the study. It was thus hypothesized that if guard cell chloroplasts are responsible for stomatal opening, it would be expected that light applied to the lower leaf surface would be much more effective at increasing stomatal conductance than light applied to the upper surface. And indeed, when red light was applied to the lower surface, stomatal conductance increased at a light intensity of <5 μmol m^{−2} s^{−1} and continued to increase with increasing light intensity, reaching a maximum at about 20 μmol m^{−2} s^{−1}.

== Nocturnal stomatal opening ==
Nocturnal stomatal conductance (g_{n}) across both C3 and C4 plants remains a highly researched topic, as the biological function of this phenomenon is ambiguous. Since photosynthesis does not occur at night, g_{n} contributes to significant water loss at night without fixing any carbon in both C3 and C4 plants. Recent studies have compiled extensive literature/data sets that reveal relative growth rate is positively correlated with nocturnal stomatal conductance. However, g_{n} does not directly correlate with positive growth; in fact, the direct effects of nocturnal stomatal conductance lead to higher transpiration rate, which decreases turgor pressure and consequently growth. Thus, it is likely that the indirect effects of g_{n} are what led to a positive growth rate, as predawn stomatal priming reduces the time it takes to reach complete stomatal responses to illumination. Further studies are needed to see how nocturnal stomatal conductance shortens the time to reach operating daytime stomatal conductance, and whether faster stomatal responses upon illumination correlate to an increase in carbon assimilation that lead to a significant contribution to the growth of the plant.

Studies have shown that nocturnal conductance is not the result of stomatal leakiness. As there is extensive genetic variation across a variety of C3 and C4 plants, g_{n} has most likely been selected for during evolution of said plants. Additionally, experiments have revealed that nocturnal stomatal conductance is regulated in an active manner, as there is a temporal change witnessed due to the presence of a circadian clock. Finally, it has been witnessed that g_{n} declines during drought, demonstrating an active response to drought. These reasons disprove the theory that stomatal leakiness causing nocturnal stomatal conductance.

Lastly, there is not consistent evidence across various plant species that the main functions of g_{n} are: to get rid of surplus CO_{2} (could limit growth), improve oxygen delivery, or aid in nutrient supply.

== Stomatal transpiration ==
Regulating stomatal conductance is critical to controlling to the amount of transpiration, or water loss from the plant. Since over 95% of water loss comes directly from the stomatal pore, changes in stomatal resistance are critical to regulating water loss. Stomatal conductance also assists in the regulation of CO_{2} uptake from the atmosphere. Regulation of stomatal transpiration is especially important when transpiration rates are high. High transpiration rates can lead to cavitation events, or when the tension in the xylem increases to the point where air bubbles begin to fill the xylem vessels. This is harmful to the plant because these air bubbles can block the flow of water up the xylem to the aerial parts of the plant. Recent studies have investigated the relationship between stomatal conductance, cavitation, and water potential. Cavitation events have been shown to decrease stomatal conductance while maintaining a stable water potential. In other words, cavitation events cause stomata to close to different extents. This limits transpiration and allows the plant to begin to repair the damaged, cavitated xylem.

Similarly, some studies have explored the relationship between drought stress and stomatal conductance. Recent studies have found that drought resistant plants regulate their transpiration rate via stomatal conductance. The hormone ABA is triggered by drought conditions and can assist in closing the stomata. This minimizes water loss and allows the plant to survive under low water conditions. However, closing the stomates can also lead to low photosynthetic rates because of limited CO_{2} uptake from the atmosphere.

== Methods for measuring ==
Stomatal conductance can be measured in several ways: Steady-state porometers: A steady state porometer measures stomatal conductance using a sensor head with a fixed diffusion path to the leaf. It measures the vapor concentration at two different locations in the diffusion path. It computes vapor flux from the vapor concentration measurements and the known conductance of the diffusion path using the following equation:

$\frac{C_{vL}-C_{v1}}{R_{vs}+R_1}=\frac{C_{v1}-C_{v2}}{R_2}$

Where $C_{vL}$ is the vapor concentration at the leaf, $C_{v1}$ and $C_{v2}$ are the concentrations at the two sensor locations, $R_{vs}$ is the stomatal resistance, and $R_1$ and $R_2$ are the resistances at the two sensors. If the temperatures of the two sensors are the same, concentration can be replaced with relative humidity, giving

$R_{vs}=\frac{1-h_1}{h_2-h_1}R_2-R_1$

Stomatal conductance is the reciprocal of resistance, therefore

$g_{vs}=\frac{1}{R_{vs}}$ .

A dynamic porometer measures how long it takes for the humidity to rise from one specified value to another in an enclosed chamber clamped to a leaf. The resistance $R$ is then determined from the following equation:

$\Delta t=\frac{\left(R+A\right)l\Delta h}{1-h}$

where ∆$t$ is the time required for the cup humidity to change by ∆$h$, $h$ is the cup humidity, $l$ is the cup "length", and $A$ is an offset constant.

Null balance porometers maintain a constant humidity in an enclosed chamber by regulating the flow of dry air through the chamber and find stomatal resistance from the following equation:

$R_{vs}=\frac{A}{f}\left(\frac{1}{h}-1\right)-R_{va}$

where $R_{vs}$ is the stomatal resistance, $R_{va}$ is the boundary layer resistance, $A$ is the leaf area, $f$ is the flow rate of dry air, and $h$ is the chamber humidity.

The resistance values found by these equations are typically converted to conductance values.

== Models ==
A number of models of stomatal conductance exist.

=== Ball-Berry-Leuning model ===
The Ball-Berry-Leuning model was formulated by Ball, Woodrow and Berry in 1987, and improved by Leuning in the early 90s. The model formulates stomatal conductance, $g$ as

$g = g_0 + \frac{a_1 A_n}{(c_s - \Gamma) (1 + \frac{D_s}{D_0})}$

where $g$ is the stomatal conductance for CO_{2} diffusion, $g_0$ is the value of $g$ at the light compensation point, $A_n$ is CO_{2} assimilation rate of the leaf, $D_s$ is the vapour pressure deficit, $c_s$ is the leaf-surface CO_{2} concentration, $\Gamma$ is the CO_{2} compensation point. $a_1$ and $D_0$ are empirical coefficients.

== See also ==
- Canopy conductance
- Ecohydrology
- Transpiration
