= Transpiration =

Process of water movement through a plant

Overview of transpiration: 1. Water is passively transported into the roots and then into the xylem.; 2. The forces of cohesion and adhesion cause the water molecules to form a column in the xylem.; 3. Water moves from the xylem into the mesophyll cells, evaporates from their surfaces and leaves the plant by diffusion through the stomata

Transpiration of water in xylem

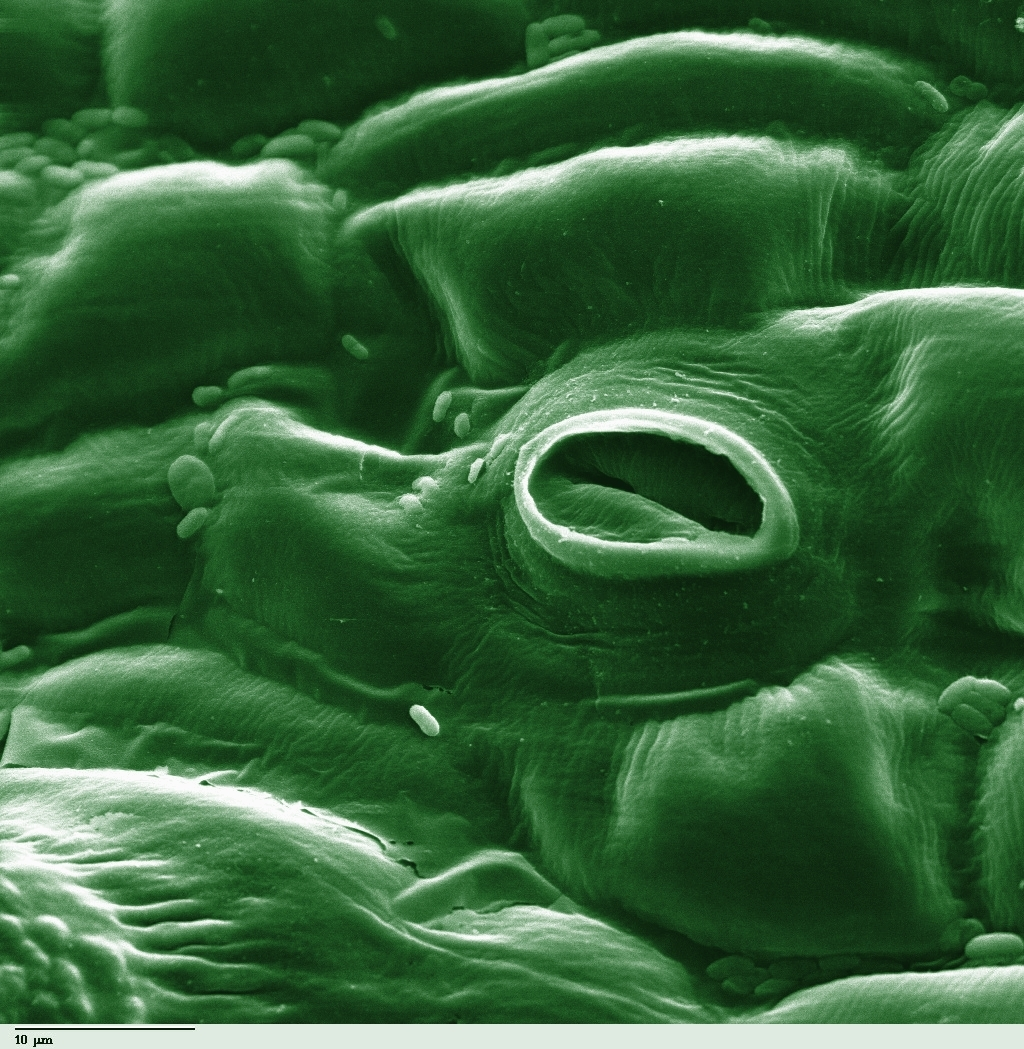
Stoma in a tomato leaf shown via colorized scanning electron microscope

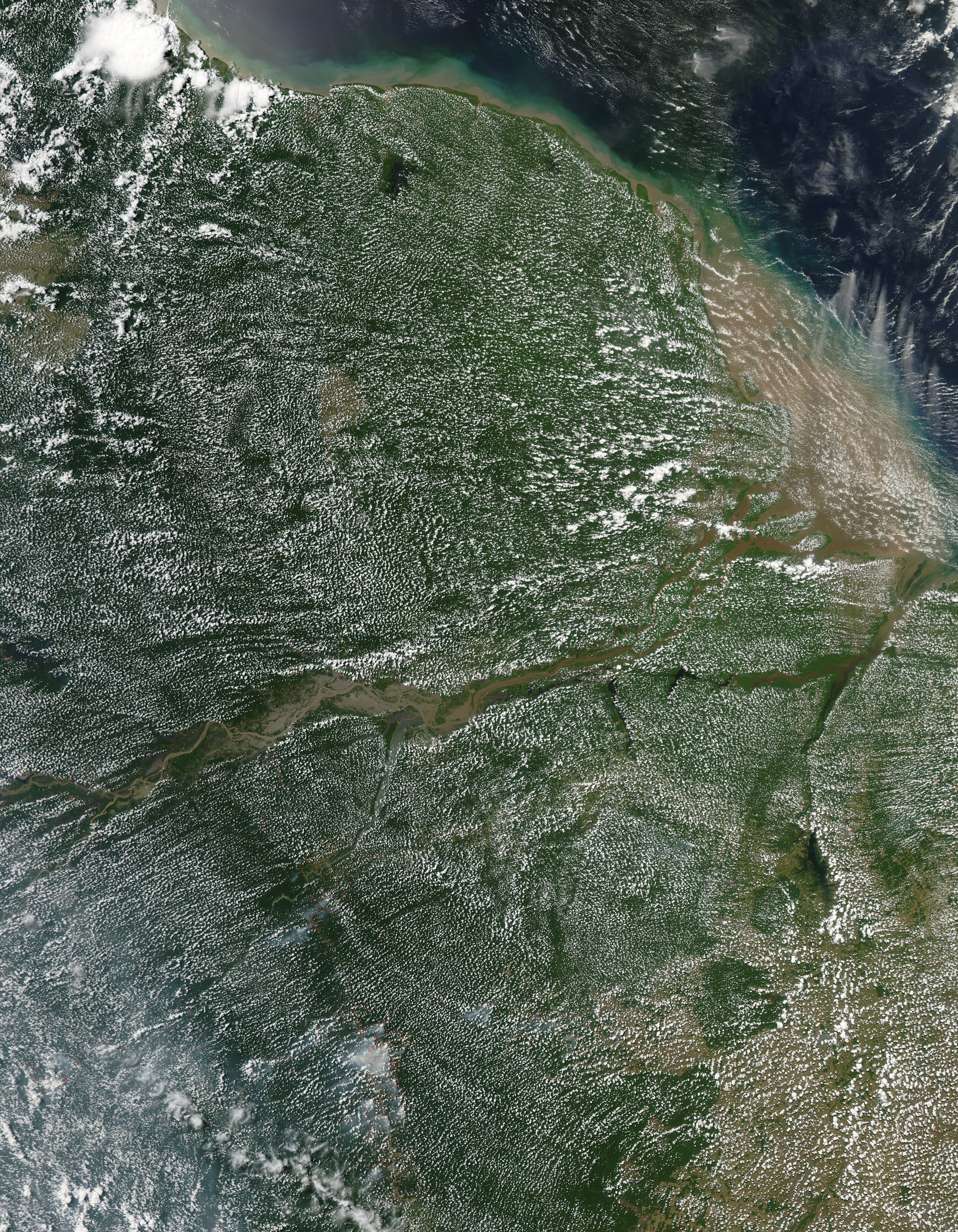
The clouds in this image of the Amazon rainforest are a result of evapotranspiration.

Transpiration is the process of water movement through a plant and its evaporation from aerial parts, such as leaves, stems and flowers. It is a passive process that requires no energy expense by the plant. Transpiration also cools plants, changes osmotic pressure of cells, and enables mass flow of mineral nutrients. When water uptake by the roots is less than the water lost to the atmosphere by evaporation, plants close small pores called stomata to decrease water loss, which slows down nutrient uptake and decreases CO_{2} absorption from the atmosphere limiting metabolic processes, photosynthesis, and growth.

== Water and nutrient uptake ==
Water is necessary for plants, but only a small amount of water taken up by the roots is used for growth and metabolism. The remaining 97–99.5% is lost by transpiration and guttation. Water with any dissolved mineral nutrients is absorbed into the roots by osmosis, which travels through the xylem by way of water molecule adhesion and cohesion to the foliage and out small pores called stomata (singular "stoma"). The stomata are bordered by guard cells and their stomatal accessory cells (together known as stomatal complex) that open and close the pore. The cohesion-tension theory explains how leaves pull water through the xylem. Water molecules stick together or exhibit cohesion. As a water molecule evaporates from the leaf's surface it pulls on the adjacent water molecule, creating a continuous water flow through the plant.

Two major factors influence the rate of water flow from the soil to the roots: the hydraulic conductivity of the soil and the magnitude of the pressure gradient through the soil. Both of these factors influence the rate of bulk flow of water moving from the roots to the stomatal pores in the leaves via the xylem. Mass flow of liquid water from the roots to the leaves is driven in part by capillary action, but primarily driven by water potential differences. If the water potential in the ambient air is lower than that in the leaf airspace of the stomatal pore, water vapor will travel down the gradient and move from the leaf airspace to the atmosphere. This movement lowers the water potential in the leaf airspace and causes evaporation of liquid water from the mesophyll cell walls. This evaporation increases the tension on the water menisci in the cell walls and decreases their radius, thus exerting tension in the cells' water. Because of the cohesive properties of water, the tension travels through the leaf cells to the leaf and stem xylem, where a momentary negative pressure is created as water is pulled up the xylem from the roots. In taller plants and trees, the force of gravity pulling the water inside can only be overcome by the decrease in hydrostatic pressure in the upper parts of the plants due to the diffusion of water out of stomata into the atmosphere.

== Etymology ==
The word transpiration comes from the words trans, a Latin preposition that means "across," and spiration, which comes from the Latin verb spīrāre, meaning "to breathe." The motion suffix adds the meaning "the act of," creating the meaning, "the ACT of breathing across."

== Capillary action ==
Capillary action is the process of a liquid flowing in narrow spaces without the assistance of, or even in opposition to, external forces like gravity. The effect can be seen in the drawing up of liquids between the hairs of a paint-brush, in a thin tube, in porous materials such as paper and plaster, in some non-porous materials such as sand and liquefied carbon fiber, or in a biological cell. It occurs because of intermolecular forces between the liquid and surrounding solid surfaces. If the diameter of the tube is sufficiently small, then the combination of surface tension (which is caused by cohesion within the liquid) and adhesive forces between the liquid and container wall act to propel the liquid.

== Regulation ==
Plants regulate the rate of transpiration by controlling the size of the stomatal apertures. The rate of transpiration is also influenced by the evaporative demand of the atmosphere surrounding the leaf such as boundary layer conductance, humidity, temperature, wind, and incident sunlight. Along with above-ground factors, soil temperature and moisture can influence stomatal opening, and thus transpiration rate. The amount of water lost by a plant also depends on its size and the amount of water absorbed at the roots. Factors that effect root absorption of water include: moisture content of the soil, excessive soil fertility or salt content, poorly developed root systems, and those impacted by pathogenic bacteria and fungi such as pythium or rhizoctonia.

| Feature | Effect on transpiration |
|---|---|
| Number of leaves | More leaves (or spines, or other photosynthesizing organs) means a bigger surface area and more stomata for gaseous exchange. This will result in greater water loss. |
| Number of stomata | More stomata will provide more pores for transpiration. |
| Size of the leaf | A leaf with a bigger surface area will transpire faster than a leaf with a smaller surface area. |
| Presence of plant cuticle | A waxy cuticle is relatively impermeable to water and water vapor and reduces evaporation from the plant surface except via the stomata. A reflective cuticle will reduce solar heating and temperature rise of the leaf, helping to reduce the rate of evaporation. Tiny hair-like structures called trichomes on the surface of leaves also can inhibit water loss by creating a high humidity environment at the surface of leaves. These are some examples of the adaptations of plants for the conservation of water that may be found on many xerophytes. |
| Light supply | The rate of transpiration is controlled by the stomatal aperture, and these small pores open especially for photosynthesis. While there are exceptions to this (such as night or CAM photosynthesis), in general, a light supply will encourage open stomata. |
| Temperature | Temperature affects the rate in two ways: 1) An increased rate of evaporation due to a temperature rise will hasten the loss of water. 2) Decreased relative humidity outside the leaf will increase the water potential gradient. |
| Relative humidity | Drier surroundings give a steeper water potential gradient, and so increase the rate of transpiration. |
| Wind | In still air, water lost due to transpiration can accumulate in the form of vapor close to the leaf surface. This will reduce the rate of water loss, as the water potential gradient from inside to outside of the leaf is then slightly less. The wind blows away much of this water vapor near the leaf surface, making the potential gradient steeper and speeding up the diffusion of water molecules into the surrounding air. Even in wind, though, there may be some accumulation of water vapor in a thin boundary layer of slower moving air next to the leaf surface. The stronger the wind, the thinner this layer will tend to be, and the steeper the water potential gradient. |
| Water supply | Water stress caused by restricted water supply from the soil may result in stomatal closure and reduce the rates of transpiration. |

The effect of temperature on the transpiration rate of plants.

The effect of wind velocity on the transpiration rate of plants.

The effect of humidity on the transpiration rate of plants.

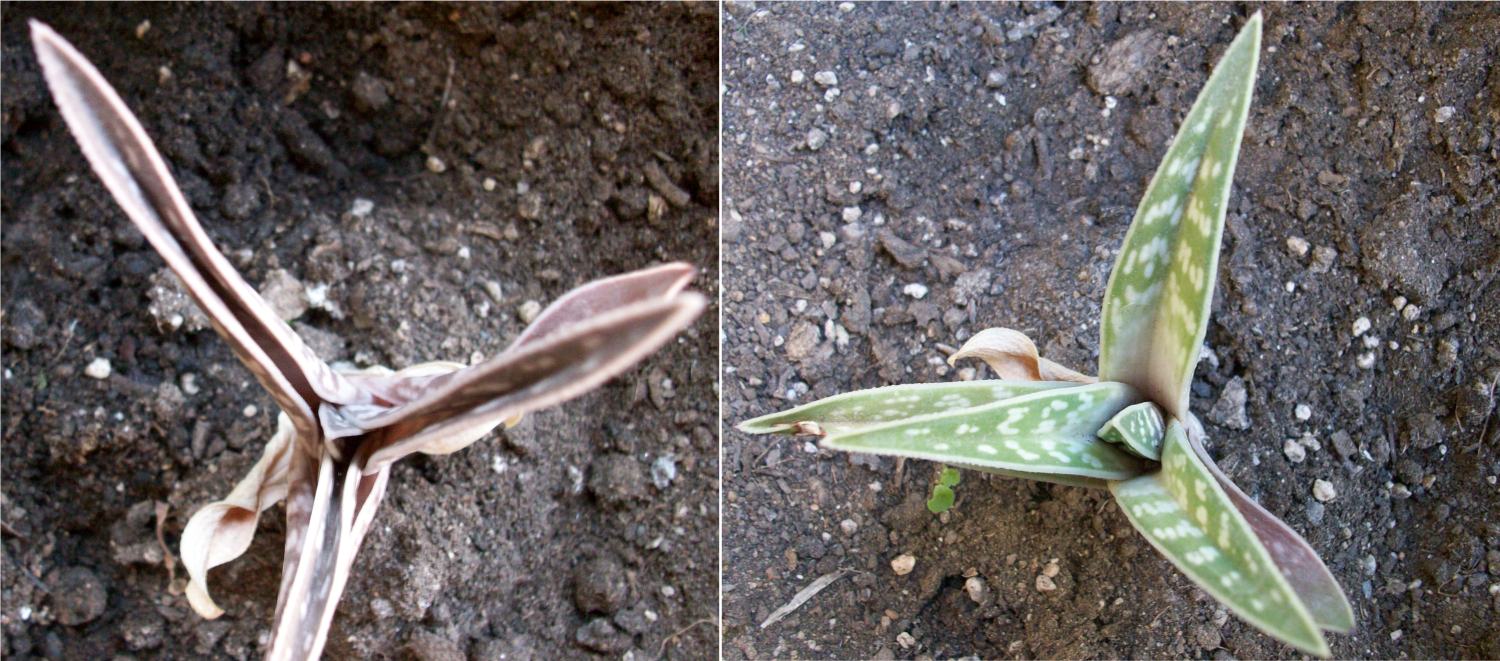
Some xerophytes will reduce the surface of their leaves during water deficiencies (left). If temperatures are cool enough and water levels are adequate the leaves expand again (right).

During a growing season, a leaf will transpire many times more water than its own weight. An acre of corn gives off about 3,000–4,000 U.S. gallons (11,000–15,000 liters) of water each day, and a large oak tree can transpire 40,000 U.S. gallons (150,000 liters) per year. The transpiration ratio is the ratio of the mass of water transpired to the mass of dry matter produced; the transpiration ratio of crops tends to fall between 200 and 1000 (i.e., crop plants transpire 200 to 1000 kg of water for every kg of dry matter produced).

Transpiration rates of plants can be measured by a number of techniques, including potometers, lysimeters, porometers, photosynthesis systems and thermometric sap flow sensors. Isotope measurements indicate transpiration is the larger component of evapotranspiration. Recent evidence from a global study of water stable isotopes shows that transpired water is isotopically different from groundwater and streams. This suggests that soil water is not as well mixed as widely assumed.

Desert plants have specially adapted structures, such as thick cuticles, reduced leaf areas, sunken stomata and hairs to reduce transpiration and conserve water. Many cacti conduct photosynthesis in succulent stems, rather than leaves, so the surface area of the shoot is very low. Many desert plants have a special type of photosynthesis, termed crassulacean acid metabolism or CAM photosynthesis, in which the stomata are closed during the day and open at night when transpiration will be lower.

=== Cavitation ===
To maintain the pressure gradient necessary for a plant to remain healthy they must continuously uptake water with their roots. They need to be able to meet the demands of water lost due to transpiration. If a plant is incapable of bringing in enough water to remain in equilibrium with transpiration an event known as cavitation occurs. Cavitation is when the plant cannot supply its xylem with adequate water so instead of being filled with water the xylem begins to be filled with water vapor. These particles of water vapor come together and form blockages within the xylem of the plant. This prevents the plant from being able to transport water throughout its vascular system. There is no apparent pattern of where cavitation occurs throughout the plant's xylem. If not effectively taken care of, cavitation can cause a plant to reach its permanent wilting point, and die. Therefore, the plant must have a method by which to remove this cavitation blockage, or it must create a new connection of vascular tissue throughout the plant. The plant does this by closing its stomates overnight, which halts the flow of transpiration. This then allows for the roots to generate over 0.05 mPa of pressure, and that is capable of destroying the blockage and refilling the xylem with water, reconnecting the vascular system. If a plant is unable to generate enough pressure to eradicate the blockage it must prevent the blockage from spreading with the use of pit pears and then create new xylem that can re-connect the vascular system of the plant.

Scientists have begun using magnetic resonance imaging (MRI) to monitor the internal status of the xylem during transpiration, in a non invasive manner. This method of imaging allows for scientists to visualize the movement of water throughout the entirety of the plant. It also is capable of viewing what phase the water is in while in the xylem, which makes it possible to visualize cavitation events. Scientists were able to see that over the course of 20 hours of sunlight more than 10 xylem vessels began filling with gas particles becoming cavitated. MRI technology also made it possible to view the process by which these xylem structures are repaired in the plant. After three hours in darkness it was seen that the vascular tissue was resupplied with liquid water. This was possible because in darkness the stomates of the plant are closed and transpiration no longer occurs. When transpiration is halted the cavitation bubbles are destroyed by the pressure generated by the roots. These observations suggest that MRIs are capable of monitoring the functional status of xylem and allows scientists to view cavitation events for the first time.

== Effects on the environment ==
=== Cooling ===
Transpiration cools plants, as the evaporating water carries away heat energy due to its large latent heat of vaporization of 2260 kJ per liter.

Transpirational cooling is the cooling provided as plants transpire water. Excess heat generated from solar radiation is damaging to plant cells and thermal injury occurs during drought or when there is rapid transpiration which produces wilting. Green vegetation contributes to moderating climate by being cooler than adjacent bare earth or constructed areas. As plant leaves transpire they use energy to evaporate water aggregating up to a huge volume globally every day.

An individual tree can transpire hundreds of liters of water per day. For every 100 liters of water transpired, the tree then cools by 70 kWh. Urban heat island effects can be attributed to the replacement of vegetation by constructed surfaces. Deforested areas reveal a higher temperature than adjacent intact forest. Forests and other natural ecosystems support climate stabilisation.

== See also ==
- Antitranspirant – a substance to prevent transpiration
- Canopy conductance
- Ecohydrology
- Eddy covariance flux (aka eddy correlation, eddy flux)
- Hydrology (agriculture)
- Latent heat flux
- Perspiration
- Soil plant atmosphere continuum
- Stomatal conductance
- Transpiration stream
- Turgor pressure
- Water Evaluation And Planning system (WEAP)
