= Transpiration stream =

Overview of transpiration. 1-Water is passively transported into the roots and then into the xylem. 2-The forces of cohesion and adhesion cause the water molecules to form a column in the xylem. 3- Water moves from the xylem into the mesophyll cells, evaporates from their surfaces and leaves the plant by diffusion through the stomata.

In plants, the transpiration stream is the uninterrupted stream of water and solutes which is taken up by the roots and transported via the xylem to the leaves where it evaporates into the air/apoplast-interface of the substomatal cavity. It is driven by capillary action and in some plants by root pressure. The main driving factor is the difference in water potential between the soil and the substomatal cavity caused by transpiration.

== Transpiration ==
Transpiration can be regulated through stomatal closure or opening. It allows for plants to efficiently transport water up to their highest body organs, regulate the temperature of stem and leaves and it allows for upstream signaling such as the dispersal of an apoplastic alkalinization during local oxidative stress.

Summary of water movement:

1. Soil
2. Roots and Root Hair
3. Xylem
4. Leaves
5. Stomata
6. Air

== Osmosis ==
The water passes from the soil to the root by osmosis. The long and thin shape of root hairs maximizes surface area so that more water can enter. There is greater water potential in the soil than in the cytoplasm of the root hair cells. As the cell's surface membrane of the root hair cell is semi-permeable, osmosis can take place; and water passes from the soil to the root hairs. The next stage in the transpiration stream is water passing into the xylem vessels. The water either goes through the cortex cells (between the root cells and the xylem vessels) or it bypasses them – going through their cell walls. After this, the water moves up the xylem vessels to the leaves through diffusion: A pressure change between the top and bottom of the vessel. Diffusion takes place because there is a water potential gradient between water in the xylem vessel and the leaf (as water is transpiring out of the leaf). This means that water diffuses up the leaf. There is also a pressure change between the top and bottom of the xylem vessels, due to water loss from the leaves. This reduces the pressure of water at the top of the vessels. This means water moves up the vessels. The last stage in the transpiration stream is the water moving into the leaves, and then the actual transpiration. First, the water moves into the mesophyll cells from the top of the xylem vessels. Then the water evaporates out of the cells into the spaces between the cells in the leaf. After this, the water leaves the leaf (and the whole plant) by diffusion through stomata.

== See also ==
- Soil plant atmosphere continuum for modelling plant transpiration.
