= Groundwater depletion =

Unsustainable extraction of groundwater

Within a long period of groundwater depletion in California's Central Valley, short periods of recovery were mostly driven by extreme weather events that typically caused flooding and had negative social, environmental and economic consequences.

Groundwater depletion or groundwater overdrafting is the process of extracting groundwater beyond the equilibrium yield of an aquifer. Groundwater is one of the largest sources of fresh water and is found underground. The primary cause of groundwater depletion is the excessive pumping of groundwater up from underground aquifers. Insufficient recharge can lead to depletion, reducing the usefulness of the aquifer for humans. Depletion can also have impacts on the environment around the aquifer, such as soil compression and land subsidence, local climatic change, soil chemistry changes, and other deterioration of the local environment.

There are two sets of yields: safe yield and sustainable yield. Safe yield is the amount of groundwater that can be withdrawn over a period of time without exceeding the long-term recharge rate or affecting the aquifer integrity. Sustainable yield is the amount of water extraction that can be sustained indefinitely without negative hydrological impacts, taking into account both recharge rate and surface water impacts.

There are two types of aquifers: confined and unconfined. In confined aquifers, there is an overbearing layer called an aquitard, which contains impermeable materials through which groundwater cannot be extracted. In unconfined aquifers, there is no aquitard, and groundwater can be freely extracted from the surface. Extracting groundwater from unconfined aquifers is like borrowing the water: it has to be recharged at a proper rate. Recharge can happen through artificial recharge and natural recharge.

== Mechanism ==
When groundwater is extracted from an aquifer, a cone of depression is created around the well. As the drafting of water continues, the cone increases in radius. Extracting too much water (overdrafting) can lead to negative impacts such as a drop of the water table, land subsidence, and loss of surface water reaching the streams. In extreme cases, the supply of water that naturally recharges the aquifer is pulled directly from streams and rivers, lowering their water levels. This affects wildlife, as well as humans who might be using the water for other purposes.

The natural process of aquifer recharge takes place through the percolation of surface water. An aquifer may be artificially recharged, such as by pumping reclaimed water from wastewater management projects directly into the aquifer. An example of is the Orange County Water District in California. This organization takes wastewater, treats it to a proper level, and then systematically pumps it back into the aquifers for artificial recharge.

Since every groundwater basin recharges at a different rate depending on precipitation, vegetative cover, and soil conservation practices, the quantity of groundwater that can be safely pumped varies greatly among regions of the world and even within provinces. Some aquifers require a very long time to recharge, and thus overdrafting can effectively dry up certain sub-surface water supplies. Subsidence occurs when excessive groundwater is extracted from rocks that support more weight when saturated. This can lead to a capacity reduction in the aquifer.

Changes in freshwater availability stem from natural and human activities (in conjunction with climate change) that interfere with groundwater recharge patterns. One of the leading anthropogenic activities causing groundwater depletion is irrigation. Roughly 40% of global irrigation is supported by groundwater, and irrigation is the primary activity causing groundwater storage loss across the U.S.

== Around the world ==
Ranking of countries that use groundwater for irrigation.
Country	Million hectares (1×10^{6} ha (2.5×10^{6} acres)) irrigated with groundwater
India	26.5
USA	10.8
China	8.8
Pakistan	4.9
Iran	3.6
Bangladesh	2.6
Mexico	1.7
Saudi Arabia	1.5
Italy	0.9
Turkey	0.7
Syria	0.6
Brazil	0.5

This ranking is based on the amount of groundwater each country uses for agriculture. This issue is becoming significant in the United States (most notably in California), but it has been an ongoing problem in other parts of the world, such as was documented in Punjab, India, in 1987.

=== United States ===
In the U.S., an estimated 800 km^{3} of groundwater was depleted during the 20th century. The development of cities and other areas of highly concentrated water usage has created a strain on groundwater resources. In post-development scenarios, interactions between surface water and groundwater are reduced; there is less intermixing between the surface and subsurface (interflow), leading to depleted water tables.

Groundwater recharge rates are also affected by rising temperatures which increase surface evaporation and transpiration, resulting in decreased water content of the soil. Anthropogenic changes to groundwater storage, such as over-pumping and the depletion of water tables combined with climate change, effectively reshape the hydrosphere and impact the ecosystems that depend on the groundwater.

== Accelerated decline in subterranean reservoirs ==
According to a 2013 report by research hydrologist Leonard F. Konikow at the United States Geological Survey (USGS), the depletion of the Ogallala Aquifer between 2001–2008 is about 32% of the cumulative depletion during the entire 20th century. In the United States, the biggest users of water from aquifers include agricultural irrigation, and oil and coal extraction. According to Konikow, "Cumulative total groundwater depletion in the United States accelerated in the late 1940s and continued at an almost steady linear rate through the end of the century. In addition to widely recognized environmental consequences, groundwater depletion also adversely impacts the long-term sustainability of groundwater supplies to help meet the Nation's water needs."

As reported by another USGS study of withdrawals from 66 major US aquifers, the three greatest uses of water extracted from aquifers were irrigation (68%), public water supply (19%), and "self-supplied industrial" (4%). The remaining 8% of groundwater withdrawals were for "self-supplied domestic, aquaculture, livestock, mining, and thermoelectric power uses."

== Environmental impacts ==
Groundwater extraction for use in water supplies lowers the overall water table, the level that groundwater sits at in an area. The lowering water table can diminish streamflow and reduce water level in other water bodies such as wetlands and lakes. In Karst systems, large-scale groundwater withdrawal can lead to sinkholes or groundwater-related subsidence. The overdrafting leads to the pressure in limestone containments to become unstable and sediments to collapse, creating a sinkhole. Overdrafting in coastal regions can lead to the reduction of water pressure in an aquifer, allowing saltwater intrusion. If saltwater contaminates a freshwater aquifer, that aquifer can no longer be used as a reliable source of freshwater for settlements and cities. Artificial recharge may return fresh water pressure to halt saltwater intrusion. However, this method can be economically inefficient and unavailable due to the high cost of the process.

When aquifers or groundwater wells experience overdraft, chemical concentrations in the water may change. Chemicals such as calcium, magnesium, sodium, carbonate, bicarbonate, chloride, and sulfate can be found in groundwater sources. Changes to water quality as a result of overdrafting may make it unsafe for human consumption; rendering the groundwater sources unusable as a source of drinking water.

Overdrafting can also affect organisms living within groundwater aquifers known as stygobionts Loss of habitat for these creatures through overdrafting has reduced biodiversity in certain areas.

Environmental impacts of overdrafting include:

- Groundwater-related subsidence: the collapse of land due to lack of support (from the water that is being depleted). The first recorded case of land subsidence was in the 1940s. Land subsidence can be as little as local land collapsing or as large as an entire region's land being lowered. The subsidence can lead to infrastructural and ecosystem damage.
- Lowering of the water table, which makes water harder to reach streams and rivers
- Reduction of water volume in streams and lakes because their supply of water is being diminished by surface water recharging the aquifers
- Impacts on animals that depend on streams and lakes for food, water, and habitat
- Deterioration to water quality
- Increase in the cost of water to the consumer due to a lower water table—more energy is needed to pump from a greater depth, so operating costs increase for companies, who pass on the expense to the consumer
- Decrease in crop production from lack of water
- Disturbances to the water cycle

=== Groundwater related subsidence ===
Groundwater-related subsidence is the subsidence (or the sinking) of land resulting from unsustainable groundwater extraction. It is a growing problem in the developing world as cities increase in population and water use, without adequate pumping regulation and enforcement. One estimate has 80% of serious U.S. land subsidence problems associated with the excessive extraction of groundwater.

== Socio-economic effects ==
Overdrafting has socio-economic impacts due to cost inequities that increase as the water table drops. As the water table drops, deeper wells are required to reach water in the aquifer. This not only requires deepening of already existing wells, but also digging new wells. Both processes are expensive. Research from Punjab found that the high cost of technology to continue water access hurts small landholders more than it does large landholders because large landholders have more resources "to invest in technology." Therefore, small landholders, who traditionally have a lower income than large landholders, are unable to benefit from the technology that allows greater water access. This creates a cycle of inequity as small landholders that are dependent on agriculture have less water to irrigate their land, producing a lower output of crops.

Additionally, overdrafting has socio-economic impacts due to prior appropriation laws. Prior appropriation rights declare that the first person to use water from a water source will maintain the right to water. These rights result in socio-economic inequities as businesses and/or larger landholders who have a higher income can maintain their water rights. Meanwhile, new businesses or smaller landholders have less access to water, resulting in less ability to profit. Due to this inequity, small farmers in Punjab with less water rights tend to grow maize or less productive rice; meanwhile, larger landholders in Punjab can use more land for rice because they have access to water.

== Possible solutions ==
Artificial Recharge:

Since recharge is the natural replenishment of water, artificial recharge is the man-made replenishment of groundwater, though there is only a limited amount of suitable water available for replenishing.

Water Conservation Techniques:

Other solutions include implementing water conservation techniques to decrease overdrafting. These include improving governance to ensure proper water management, incentivizing water conservation, improving agriculture techniques to ensure water use is efficient, changing diets to crops that require less water, and investing in infrastructure that uses water sustainably. The state of California has implemented some water conservation techniques due to droughts in the state. Some of their techniques include prohibitions on: 1) outdoor watering that runs onto sidewalks or other on hard surfaces that don't absorb water, 2) washing vehicles with a hose that does not have a shutoff handle, 3) watering within 48 hours after a quarter inch of rain, and 4) watering commercial/industrial decorative grass.

Water Conservation Incentivization:

Techniques used by California in emergency situations are useful; however, incentive to follow through on these is important. The city of Spokane has a program to incentivize sustainable landscapes called SpokaneScape. This program incentivizes water efficient landscapes by offering homeowners up to $500 in credit on their utility bill if they adapt their yards to water efficient plants.

== See also ==
- Cone of depression
- Groundwater recharge
- Groundwater-related subsidence
- Drinking water
- Overexploitation
- Water crisis
- Human overpopulation
