= River mouth =

Endpoint of a river

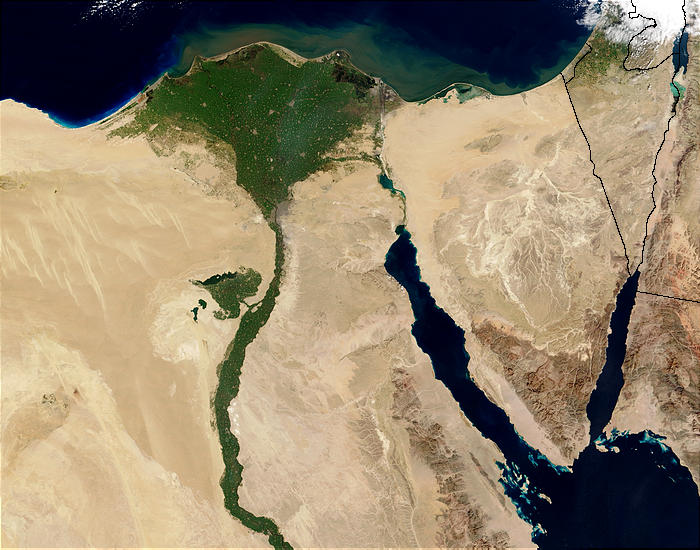
The mouth of the Nile where it empties into the Mediterranean Sea

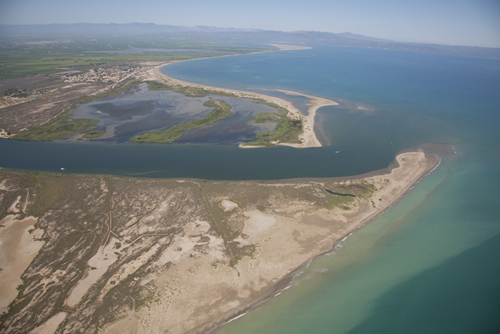
The mouth of the Ebro

A river mouth is where a river flows into a larger body of water, such as another river, a lake/reservoir, a bay/gulf, a sea, or an ocean. At the river mouth, sediments are often deposited due to the slowing of the current, reducing the carrying capacity of the water.

The water from a river can enter the receiving body in a variety of different ways. The motion of a river is influenced by the relative density of the river compared to the receiving water, the rotation of the Earth, and any ambient motion in the receiving water, such as tides or seiches.

If the river water has a higher density than the surface of the receiving water, the river water will plunge below the surface. The river water will then either form an underflow or an interflow within the lake. However, if the river water is lighter than the receiving water, as is typically the case when fresh river water flows into the sea, the river water will float along the surface of the receiving water as an overflow.

Alongside these advective transports, inflowing water will also diffuse.

== Landforms ==
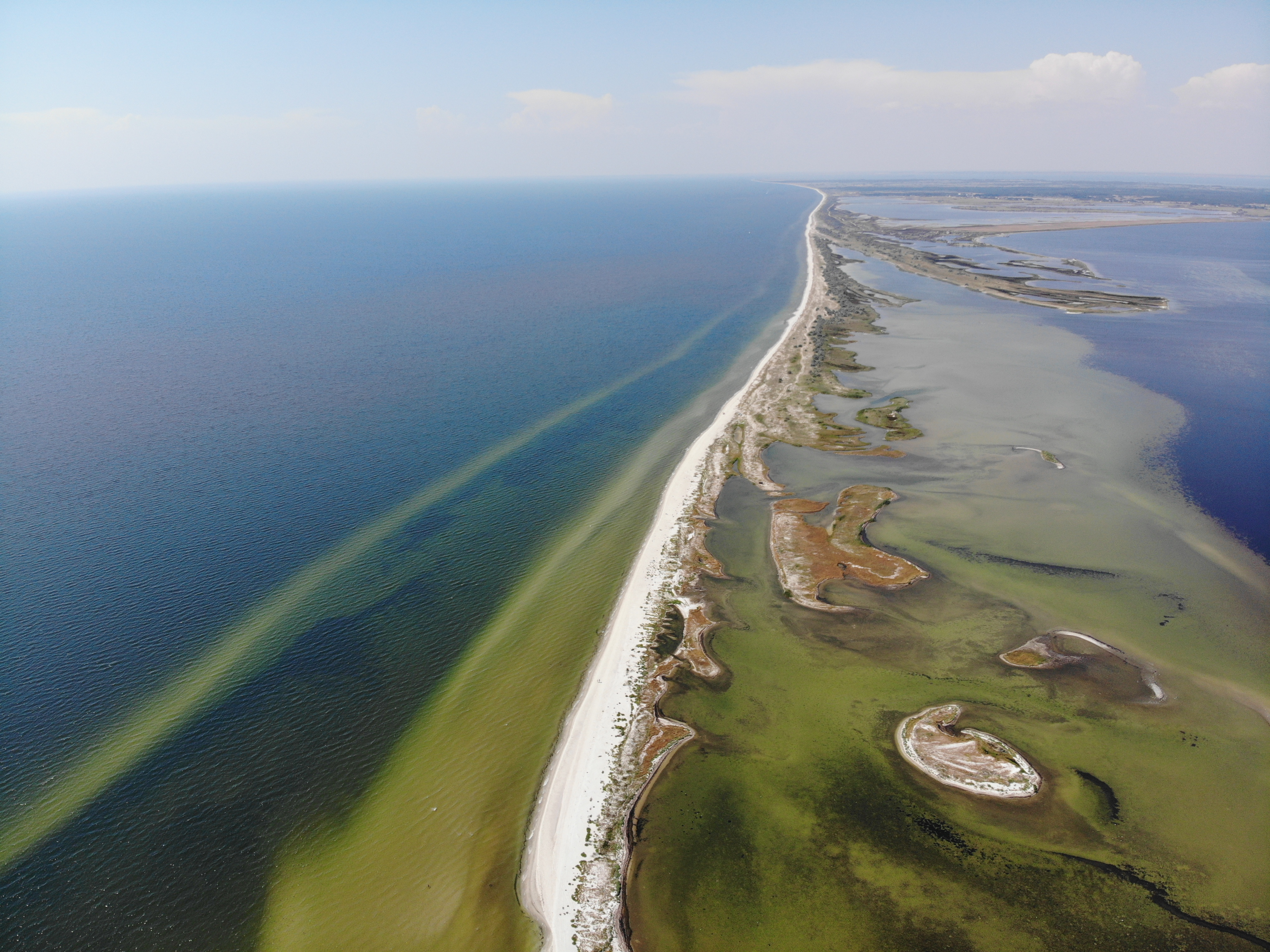
Aerial picture of the Kinburn Spit.

At the mouth of a river, the change in flow conditions can cause the river to drop any sediment it is carrying. This sediment deposition can generate a variety of landforms, such as deltas, sand bars, spits, and tie channels. Landforms at the river mouth drastically alter the geomorphology and ecosystem. Along coasts, sand bars and similar landforms act as barriers, sheltering sensitive ecosystems that are enriched by nutrients deposited from the river. However, the damming of rivers can starve the river of sand and nutrients, creating a deficit at the river's mouth.

== Cultural influence ==
As river mouths are the site of large-scale sediment deposition and allow for easy travel and ports, many towns and cities are founded there. Many places in the United Kingdom take their names from their positions at the mouths of rivers, such as Plymouth (i.e. mouth of the Plym River), Sidmouth (i.e. mouth of the Sid River), and Great Yarmouth (i.e. mouth of the Yare River). In Celtic, the corresponding terms are Aber or Inver, from which come numerous place names such as Aberdeen, Abercrombie, and Abernethy, as well as Inverness, Inverkip, and Inveraray.

Due to rising sea levels as a result of climate change, the coastal cities are at heightened risk of flooding. Sediment starvation in the river compounds this concern.

== See also ==
- Confluence
- Estuary
- Liman
