= Gully =

Landform created by running water and/or mass movement eroding sharply into soil

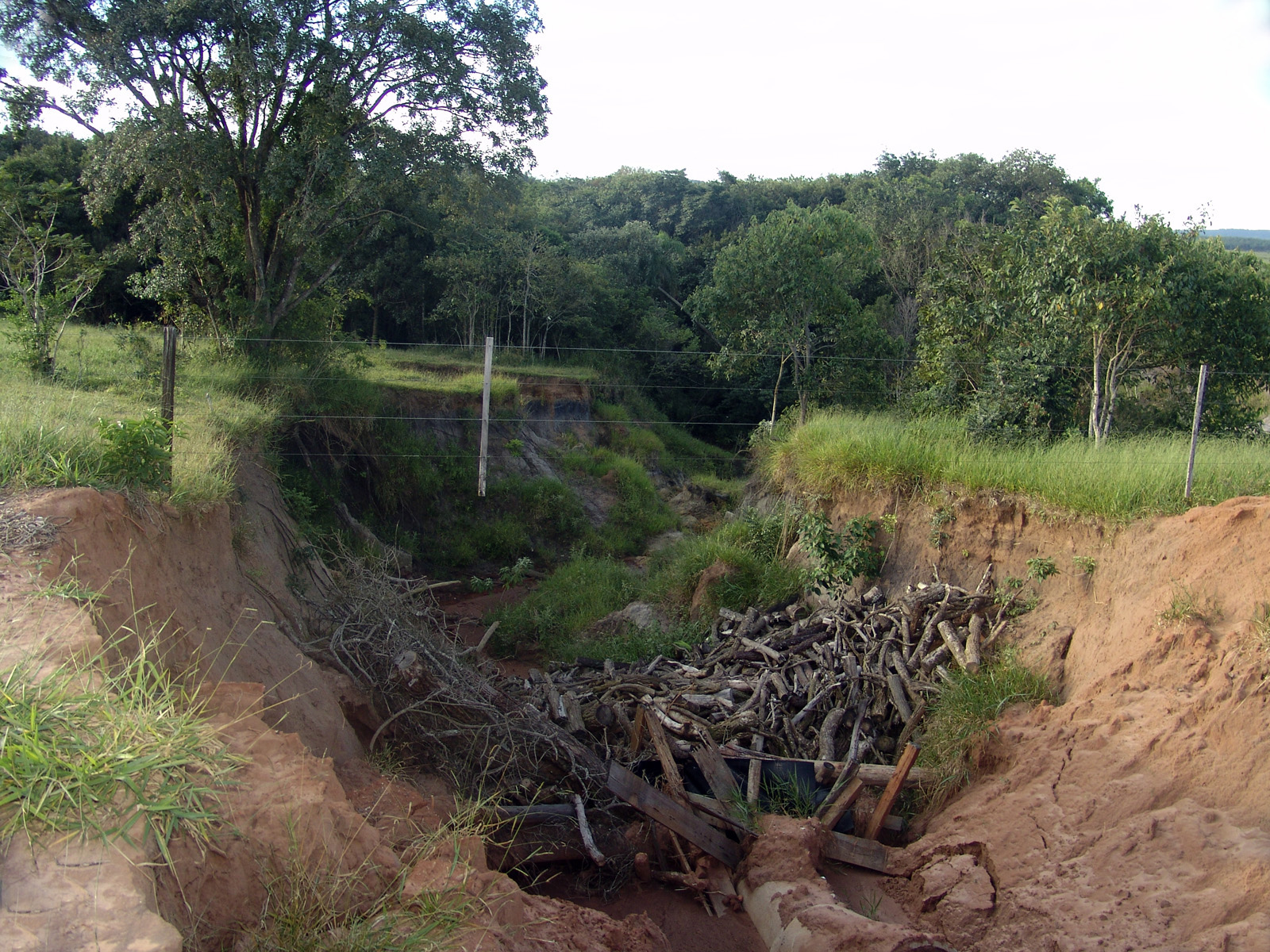
A gully in Avaré, Brazil

A gully is a landform created by running water, mass movement, or both, which erodes soil to a sharp angle, typically on a hillside or in river floodplains or terraces.

Gullies resemble large ditches or small valleys, but are metres to tens of metres in depth and width, are characterized by a distinct 'headscarp' or 'headwall' and progress by headward (i.e., upstream) erosion. Gullies are commonly related to intermittent or ephemeral water flow, usually associated with localised intense or protracted rainfall events or snowmelt.

Gullies can be formed and accelerated by cultivation practices on hillslopes (often gentle gradients) in farmland, and they can develop rapidly in rangelands from existing natural erosion forms subject to vegetative cover removal and livestock activity.

== Etymology ==
The earliest known usage of the term is from 1657. It originates from the French word goulet, a diminutive form of goule which means throat. The term may be connected to the name of a type of knife used at the time, a gully-knife.

Water erosion is more likely to occur on steep terrain because of erosive pressures, splashes, scour, and transport. Slope characteristics, such as slope length and amounts proportionate to slope length, affect soil erosion. Relief and soil erosion are positively correlated in southeast Nigeria. There are three types of topography: mountains, cuesta landscapes, and plains and lowlands. While highlands with stable lithology avoid gullying yet allow for vigorous runoff, uplands with friable sandstones are more prone to erosion.

== Formation and consequences ==
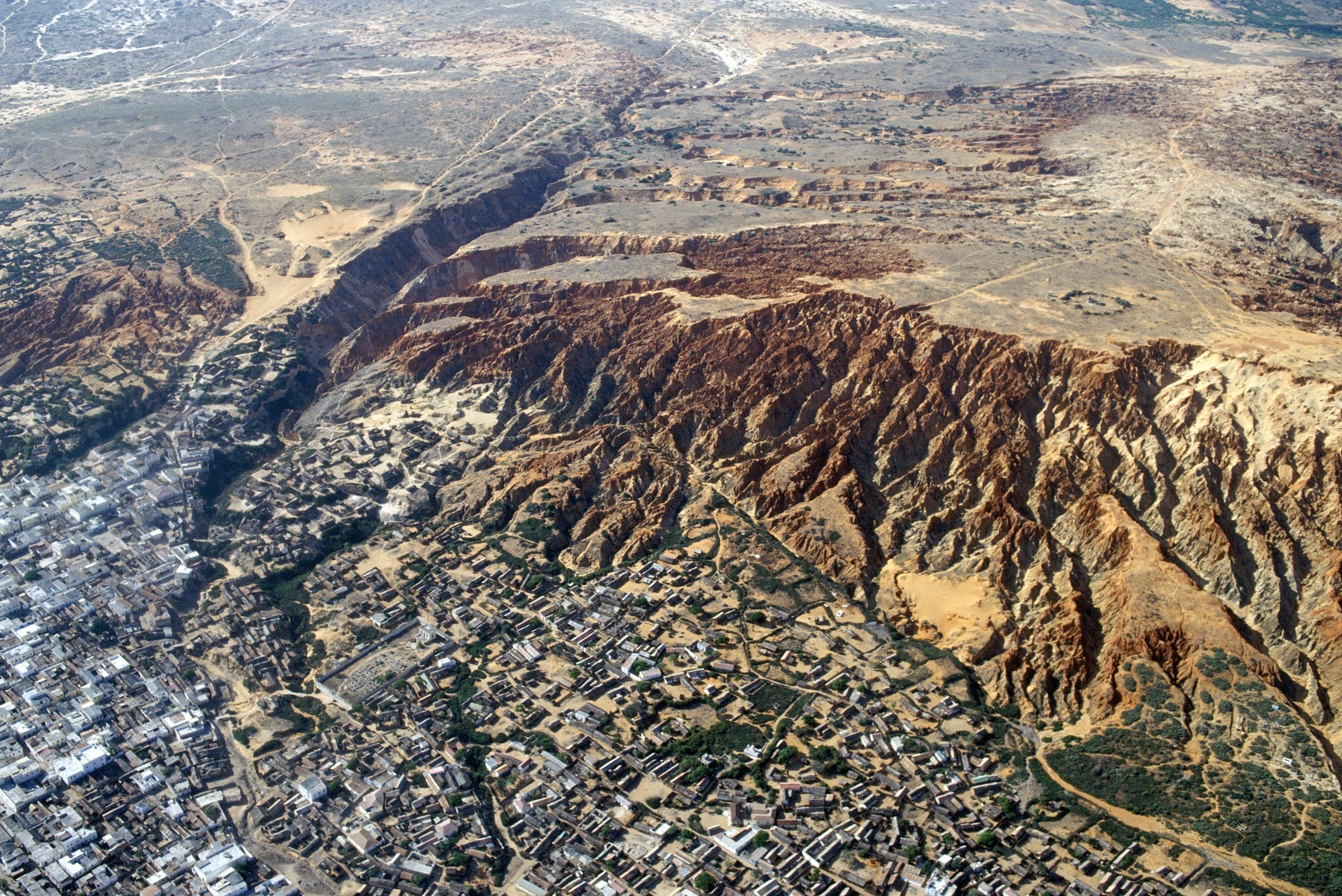
Gullied landscape in Somalia

Gully erosion can progress through a variety and combination of processes. The erosion processes include incision and bank erosion by water flow, mass movement of saturated or unsaturated bank or wall material, groundwater seepage - sapping the overlying material, collapse of soil pipes or tunnels in dispersive soils, or a combination of these to a greater or lesser degree. Hillsides are more prone to gully erosion when they are cleared of vegetation cover through deforestation, overgrazing, or other means. Gullies in rangelands can be initiated by concentrated water flow down tracks worn by livestock or vehicle tracks. The flowing water easily carries the eroded soil after being dislodged from the ground, typically when rainfall falls during short, intense storms such as thunderstorms.

A gully may grow in length through headward (i.e., upstream) erosion at a knickpoint. This erosion can result from interflow and soil piping (internal erosion) as well as surface runoff. Gully erosion may also advance laterally through similar methods, including mass movement, acting on the gully walls (banks), and the development of 'branches' (a type of tributary).

Gullies reduce the productivity of farmlands where they incise into the land and produce sediment that may choke downstream waterbodies and reduce water quality within the drainage system and lake or coastal system. Because of this, much effort is invested into the study of gullies within the scope of geomorphology and soil science, in the prevention of gully erosion, and in remediation and rehabilitation of gullied landscapes. The total soil loss from gully formation and subsequent downstream river sedimentation can be substantial, especially from unstable soil materials prone to dispersion.

When water is directed over exposed ground, gully erosion removes soil near drainage lines. This may result in divided properties, loss of arable land, diminished amenities, and decreased property values. Additionally, it can lead to sedimentation, discoloration of the water supply, and creating a haven for rodents.

Water rushing over exposed, naked soil creates gullies and ridges that erode rock and soil. When water rushes across exposed terrain, it erodes or pushes dirt away, creating rills. Gravity causes rift erosion on a downward slope, with steeper slopes generating greater water flow. Sandier terrains are more commonly affected by rills most prevalent during the rainier months. Gullies develop when a rill is neglected for an extended time, thickening and expanding as soil erosion persists.

The factors influencing gully erosion were investigated in Zaria, Kaduna state, Nigeria, utilizing SRTM data, soil samples, rainfall data, and satellite imagery. The findings indicated that the factors that had the biggest effects on gully erosion were slope (56%) and rainfall (26%), land cover (12%), and soil (6%). The investigation concluded that each particular component significantly influenced soil loss.

=== Effects of gullies ===
The loss of fertile farmland due to gully erosion is a severe environmental problem that lowers crop quality and may cause famine and food shortages. It also causes the soil to lose organic content, which has an impact on plant viability. As items washed from fields end up in rivers, streams, or vacant land, erosion also contaminates the ecosystem. Because of increased population expansion and increasing land demand, erosion also threatens the natural ecosystem, encroaching on natural forests. Important assets including homes, power poles, and water pipelines may also be destroyed.

=== Prevention of gullies ===
Effective land management techniques can prevent gullies. These techniques include keeping vegetation along drainage lines, using more water, classifying drainage lines as distinct land classes, stabilizing erosion, preventing vermin, distributing runoff evenly, keeping soil organic matter levels high, and avoiding over-cultivation. These tactics guarantee uniform rates of penetration and robust plant coverage. Plant leftovers and other vegetation barriers can prevent erosion, although their usefulness is limited.

Information on gully prevention and control methods is dispersed and often lacking, especially regarding success rates and efficacy. Biophysical environment, terrain, climate, and geomorphology affect runoff, sediment properties and gully stability. These factors can lead to the failure of gully control techniques.

==== Stabilising gullies ====
Stabilizing gullies entails altering water flow to lessen scouring, sediment buildup, and revegetation. Water can be securely moved from the natural level to the gully floor using a variety of structures, including drop structures, pipe structures, grass chutes, and rock chutes. Structural modifications can be required along steep gully floors. Vegetation can reestablish itself thanks to sediments deposited over flatter gradients. Until the restoration is finished, damaged areas should be walled off.

==== Gully remediation in Eastern Nigeria ====
Eastern Nigeria's people and ecology are seriously threatened by gully erosion. A research project focused on 370 families and nine risk regions evaluated the region's gully erosion issues. The greatest perceived problem, according to the results, was biodiversity loss. In contrast, damage to properties, roads, and walkways was ranked as the least important issue. This implies a notable variation in the average evaluations across impacted individuals, underscoring the necessity for long-term repair approaches. Reducing soil loss, raising public knowledge of environmental issues, passing environmental legislation, and giving residents funds to strengthen their coping mechanisms are all advised by the study.

In Agulu-Nanka, Southeast Nigeria, a study examined the geoenvironmental causes driving gully erosion. It focuses on catchment management for gully erosion and geotechnical analysis. Through fieldwork, data was gathered utilizing GIS and GPS methods. According to the study, gully erosion occurs throughout, with Nanka/Oko having the highest concentration. The gully characteristic map shows variations in length and depth, emphasizing the necessity of considering gully vulnerability and giving erosion hazards immediate attention.

== Artificial gullies ==
Gullies can be formed or enlarged by several human activities.

Artificial gullies are formed during hydraulic mining when jets or streams of water are projected onto soft alluvial deposits to extract gold or tin ore. The remains of such mining methods are very visible landform features in old goldfields such as in California and northern Spain. The badlands at Las Medulas, for example, was created during the Roman period by hushing or hydraulic mining of the gold-rich alluvium with water supplied by numerous aqueducts tapping nearby rivers. Each aqueduct produced large gullies below by erosion of the soft deposits. The effluvium was carefully washed with smaller streams of water to extract the nuggets and gold dust.

== Termination of gullies ==
Gully initiation results from localized erosion by surface runoff, often focusing on areas where forest cover has been removed for agricultural purposes, uneven compaction of surface soils by foot and wheeled traffic, and poorly designed road culverts and gutters. Termination of gully processes requires water-resource management, soil conservation, and community migration. Gully erosion is localized in the Coastal Plain Sands, Nanka Sands, and Nsukka Sandstone of the Anambra-Imo basin region. The most affected deposits are unconsolidated or poorly consolidated and have short dispersion times. Public education is essential for a sustainable termination strategy, and collaboration between the government, donors, the private sector, and rural people is crucial.

== On Mars ==
Gullies are widespread at mid-to-high latitudes on the surface of Mars and are some of the youngest features observed on that planet, probably forming within the last few 100,000 years. There, they are one of the best lines of evidence for the presence of liquid water on Mars in the recent geological past, probably resulting from the slight melting of snowpacks on the surface or ice in the shallow subsurface on the warmest days of the Martian year. Flow as springs from deeper seated liquid water aquifers in the deeper subsurface is also a possible explanation for the formation of some Martian gullies.

== Gallery ==
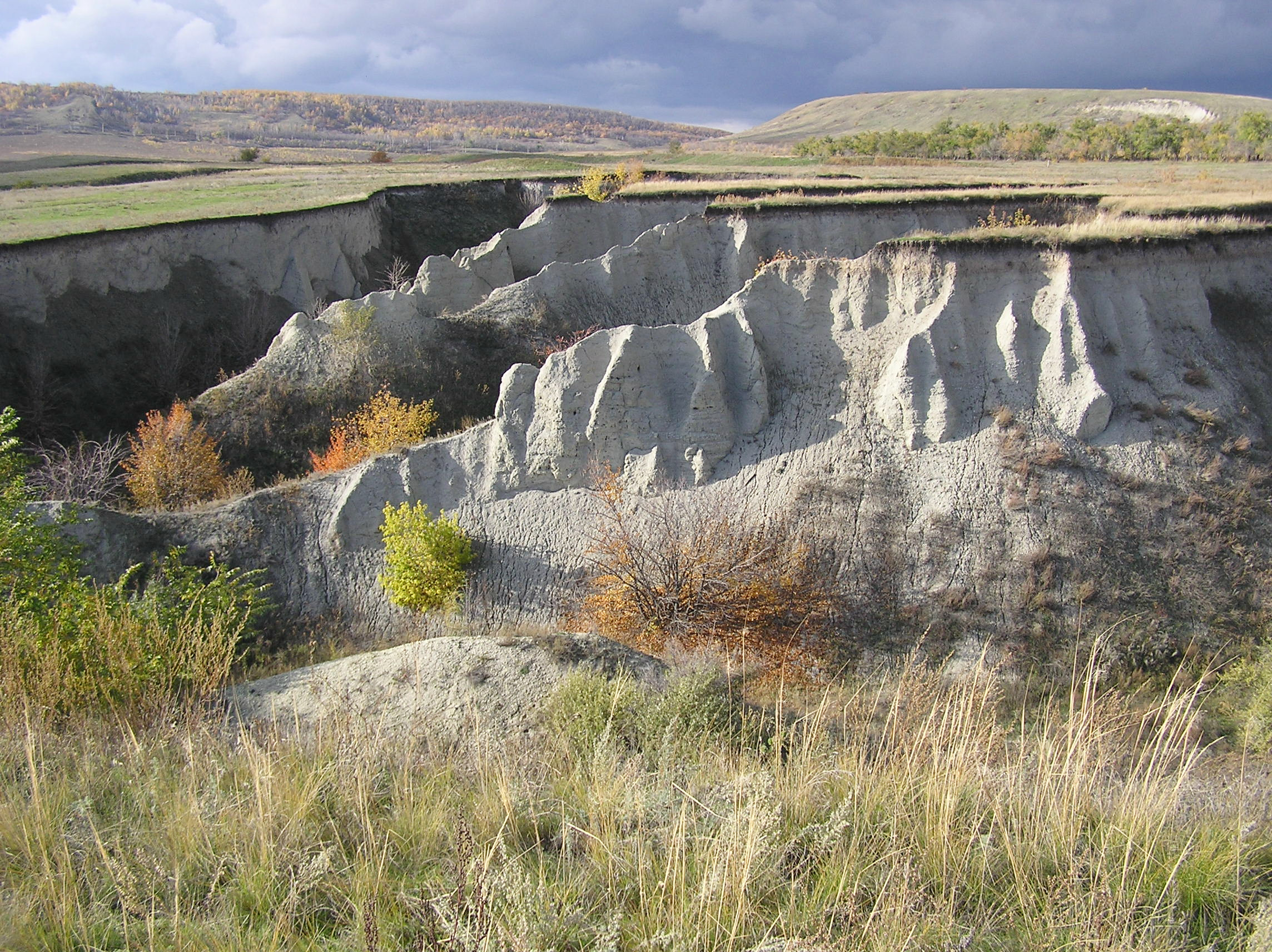
A gully in Saratov Oblast, Russia

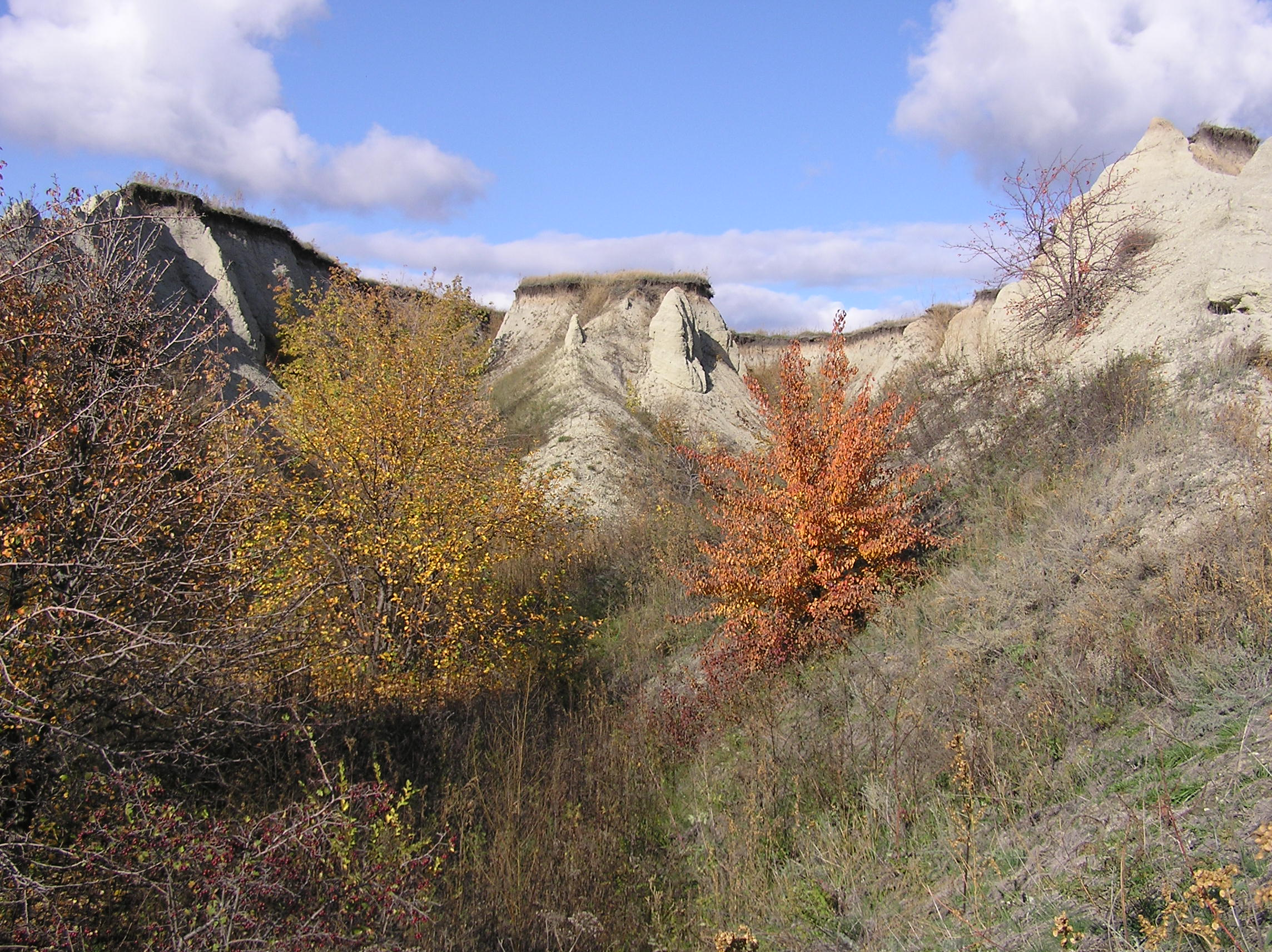
Inside the gully (to the left) in Saratov Oblast, Russia.

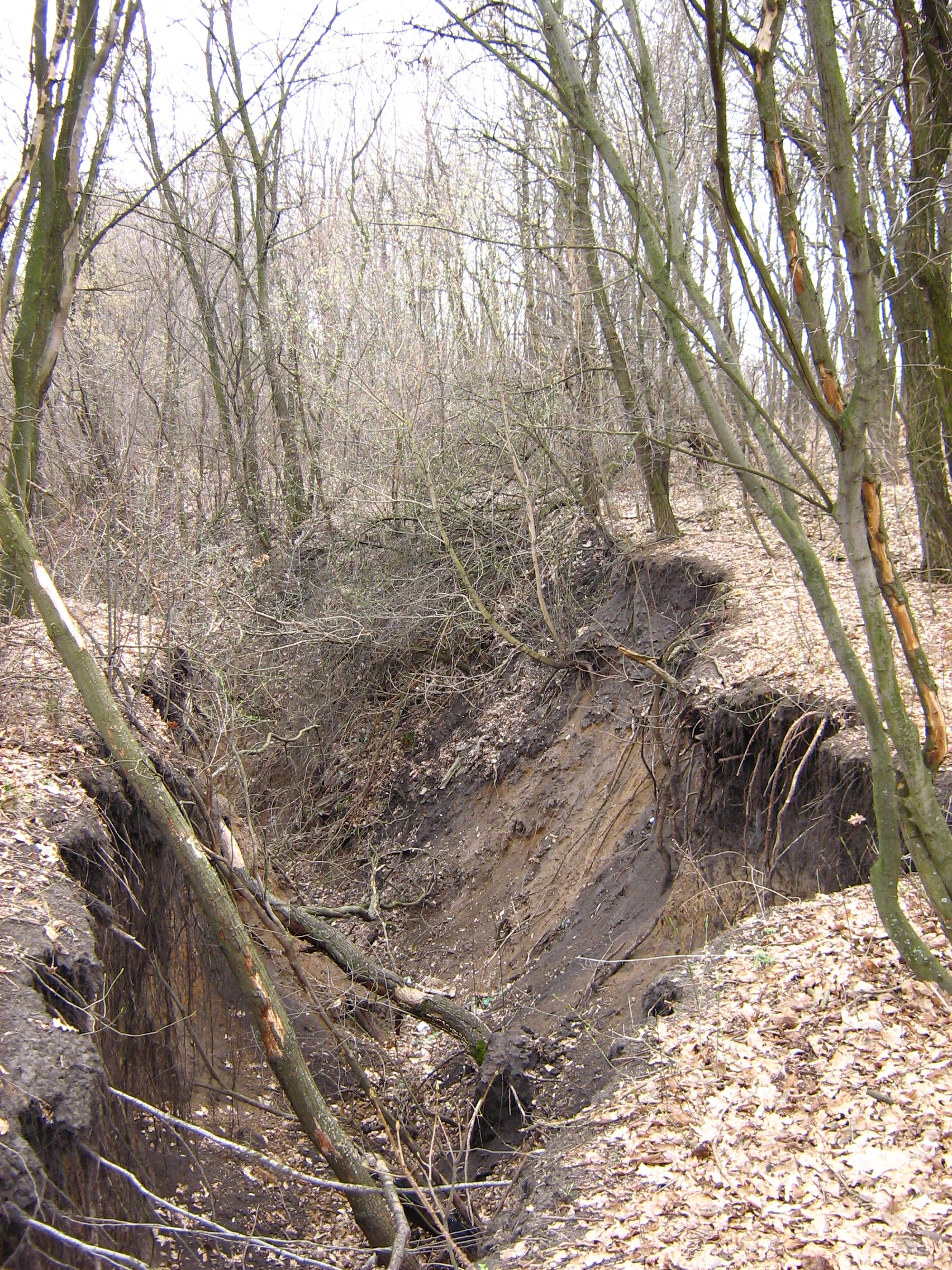
A gully in Kharkiv oblast, Ukraine.

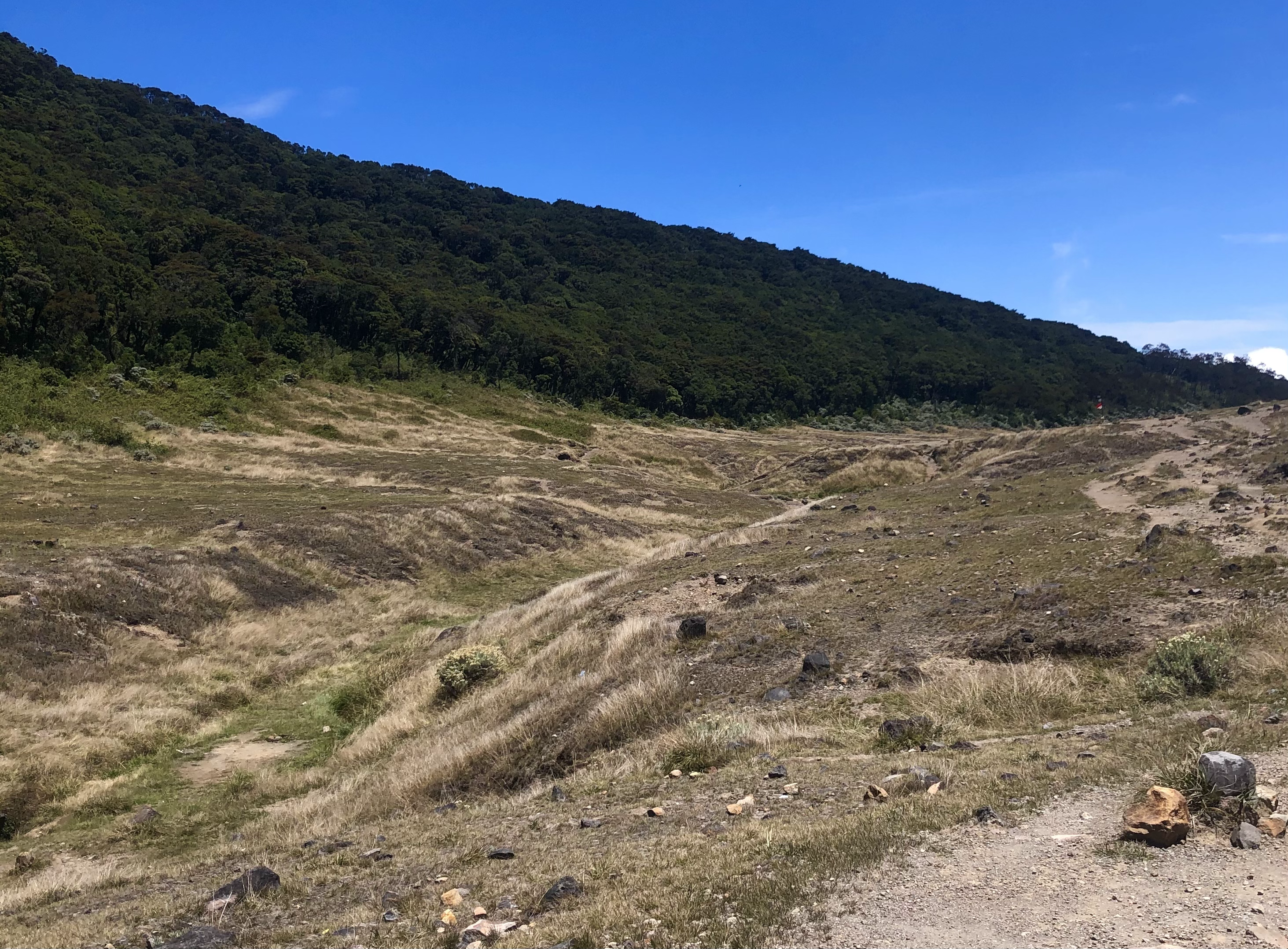
Gully formed from volcanic sedimentation in West Java, Indonesia

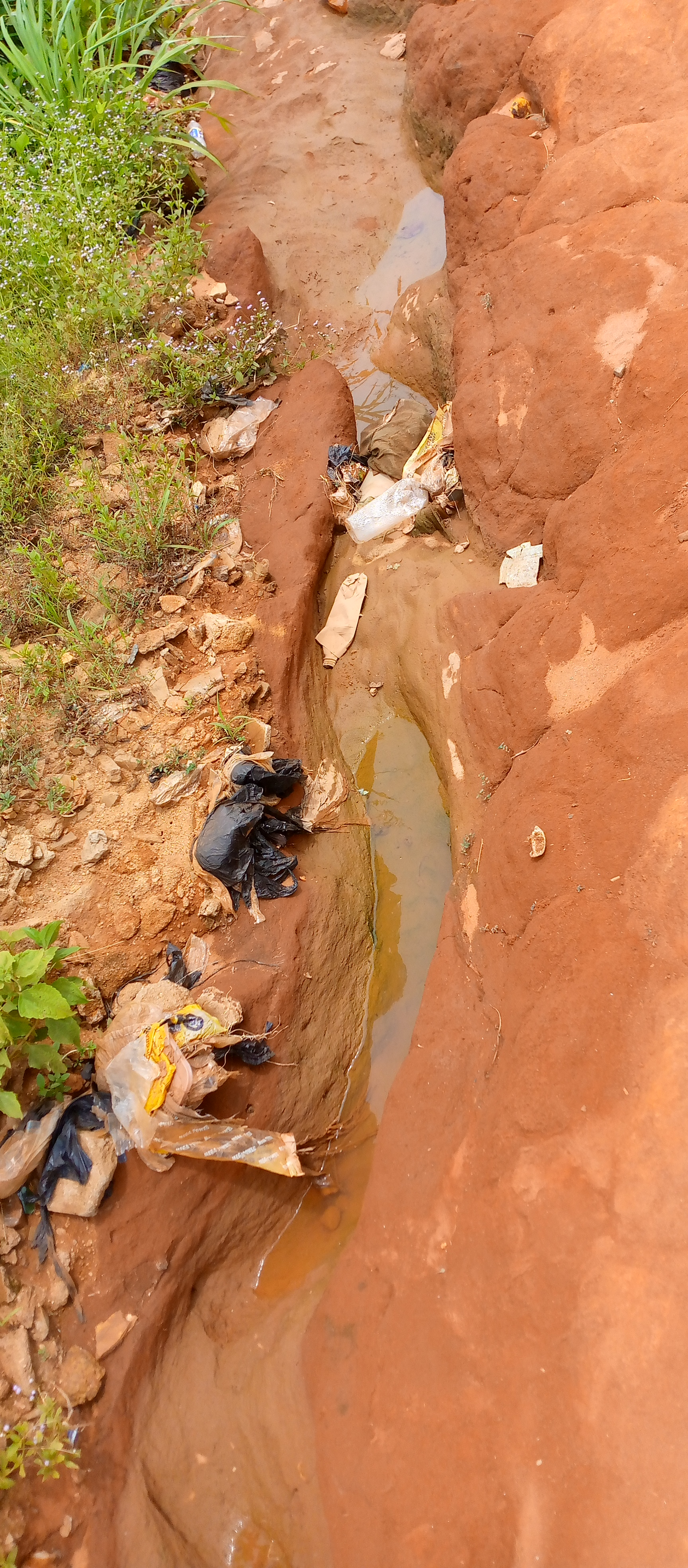
A Gully formed by flood in Isuaniocha community of Anambra State, Nigeria

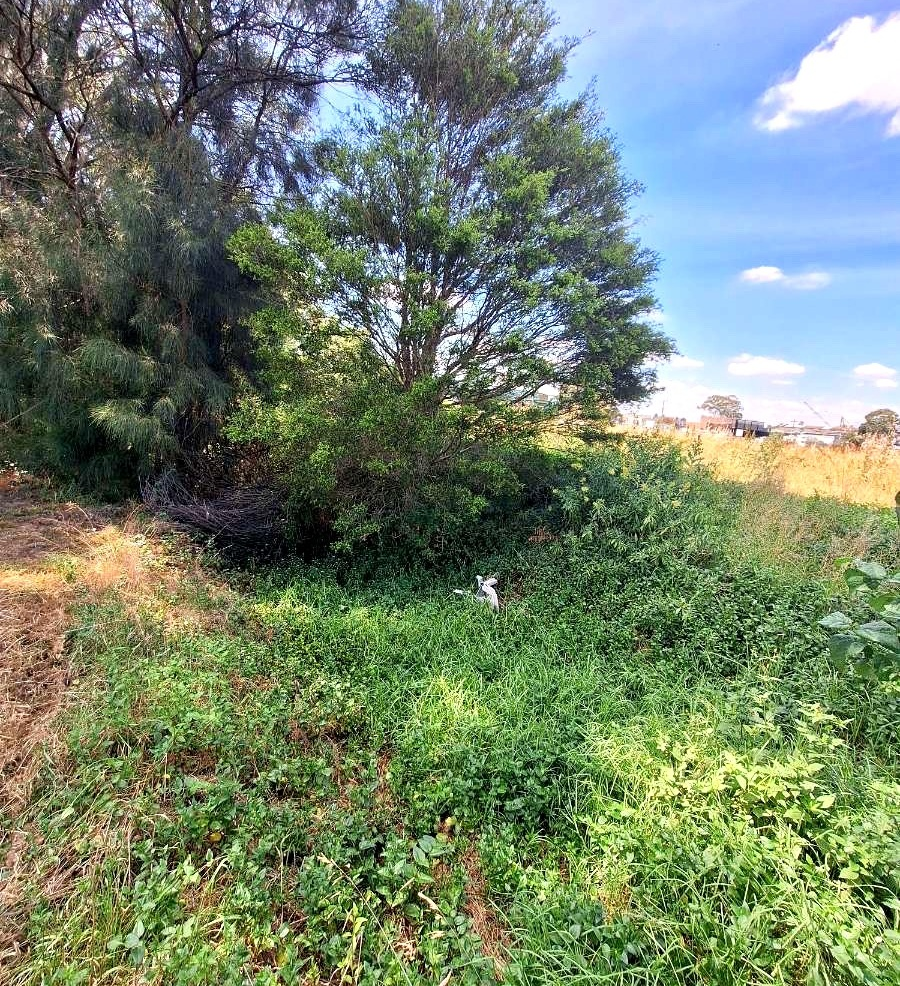
A gully in Sydney, Australia infested by weeds.

== See also ==
- Arroyo (watercourse) – Dry watercourse with flow after rain
- Badlands – Type of heavily eroded terrain
- Chine – Steep-sided coastal gorge in central southern England
- Coulee – Type of valley or drainage zone
- Couloir – Steep, narrow mountain gully – a narrow gully with a steep gradient in a mountainous terrain
- Dale (landform) – Open valley
- Draw (terrain) – Long area of downward-sloping low ground
- Gulch – Deep V-shaped valley formed by erosion
- Lavaka – Type of gully, formed via groundwater sapping
- Landslide – Natural hazard involving ground movement
- Linn (geology) – Scottish geological water feature – gully in Scotland or Northern England in rock
- Ravine – Small valley, often due to stream erosion
- Rift – Geological linear zone where the lithosphere is being pulled apart
- Rill – Shallow channel cut by water – a shallow channel cut into soil by erosion from flowing water
- Sinkhole – Geologically-formed topological depression
- Wadi – Hydrological feature
