= Center-pivot irrigation =

Method of crop irrigation

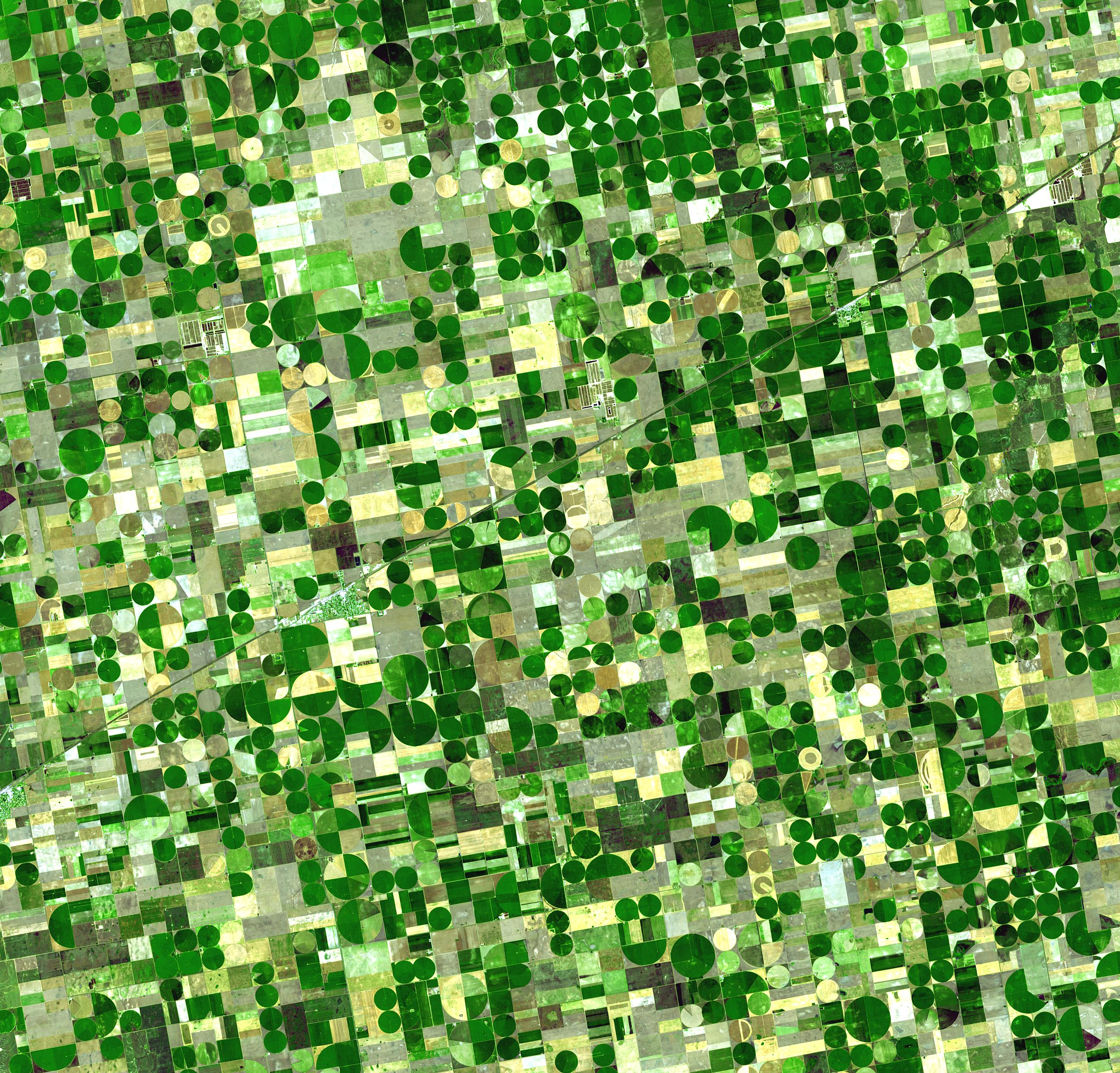
A satellite image of circular fields characteristic of center-pivot irrigation, Kansas

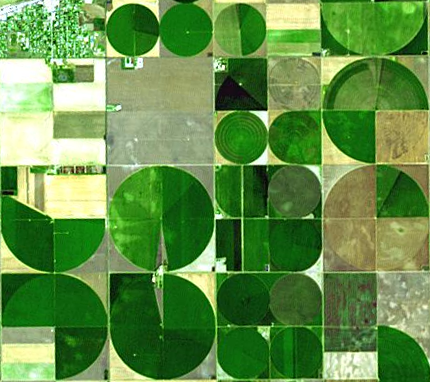
Farmland with circular-pivot irrigation

Center-pivot irrigation (sometimes called central-pivot irrigation), also called water-wheel and circle irrigation, is a method of crop irrigation in which equipment rotates around a pivot and crops are watered with sprinklers. A circular area centered on a pivot is irrigated, often creating a circular pattern in crops when viewed from above (sometimes referred to as crop circles, not to be confused with those formed by circular flattening of a section of a crop in a field). Most center-pivot systems were water-powered; however, today most are propelled by electric motors.

Center-pivot irrigation systems are beneficial due to their ability to efficiently use water and optimize a farm's yield. The systems are highly effective on large land fields.

== History ==
On March 23, 1914 James A. Norton of Odebolt, Iowa, filed the patent for the center-pivot irrigation system. On August 17, 1915, it was granted as patent #1150144. The patent drawings shows multiple pairs of wheels supporting a pipe that is moved in a circle around a central pivot point. The description is: Watering arrangements making use of movable installations on wheels or the like movable around a pivot center.

Center-pivot irrigation was invented in 1940 by the farmer Frank Zybach, who lived in Strasburg, Colorado. It is recognized as an effective method to improve water distribution to fields.

In 1952, Zybach went into business with A. E. Trowbridge, a friend, Ethan James Olson, from Columbus, Nebraska. Trowbridge put up $25,000 (equivalent to $303,000 in 2025) and got 49% of the patent rights. Zybach moved back from Colorado to Columbus, opened a shop, hired a few men, moved the height of the pipe up to 1.8 m (6 ft), and went into business. In the first two years of operation, they sold only 19 systems. The early designs were finicky and few farmers understood the systems. Zybach kept improving his designs and focused on making his machines better, rather than attempting to sell systems with problems.

Zybach saw success with modified designs, which improved the systems operational efficiency. In 1954, he licensed his patent to Robert Daugherty and his company, Valley Manufacturing. Daugherty's engineers spent the next decade refining Zybach's innovation, making it sturdier, taller, and more reliable, and converting it from a hydraulic power system to electric drive. Daugherty's company went on to grow into Valmont Industries, with Valley Irrigation being its subsidiary.

== Overview ==
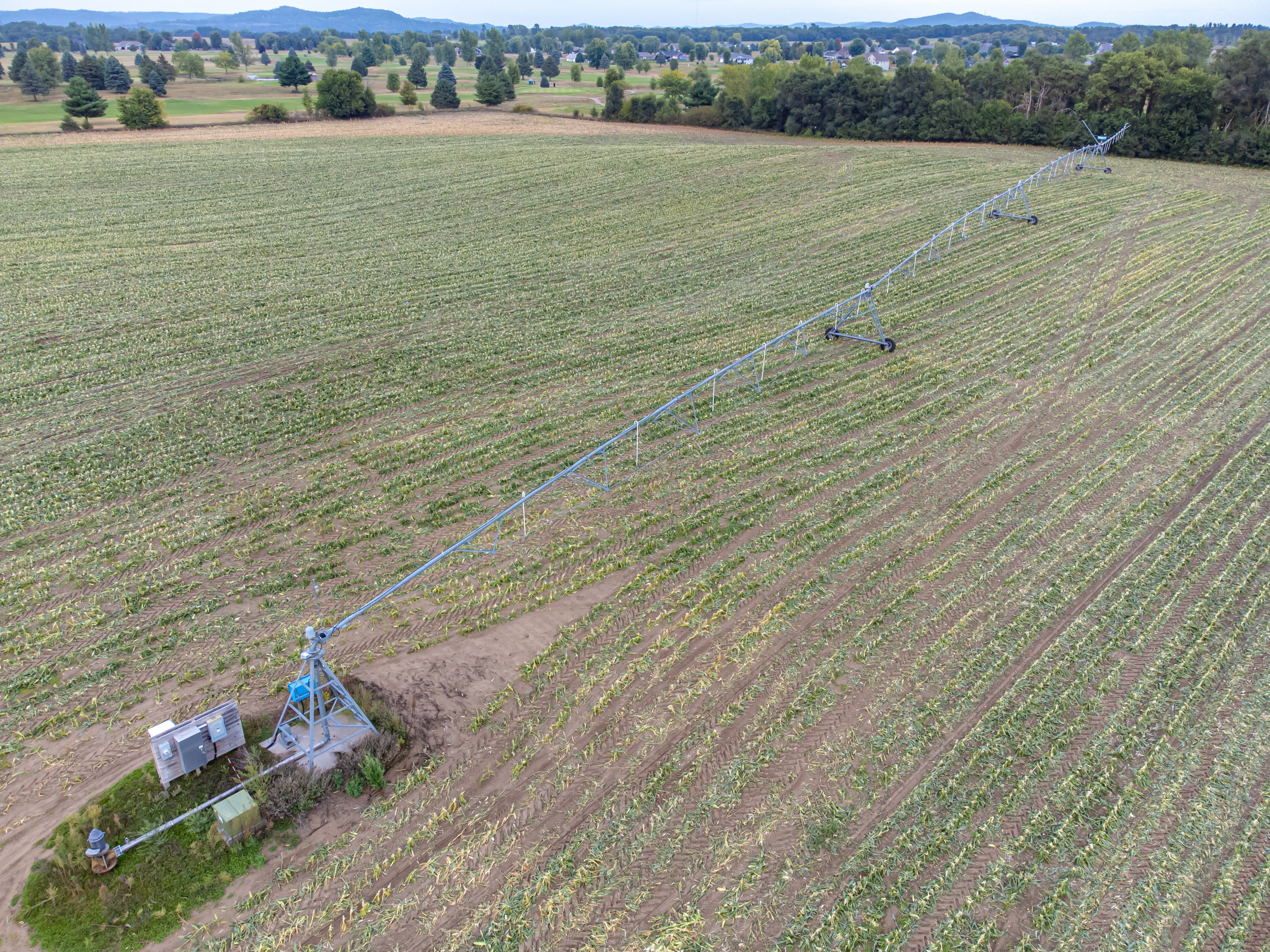
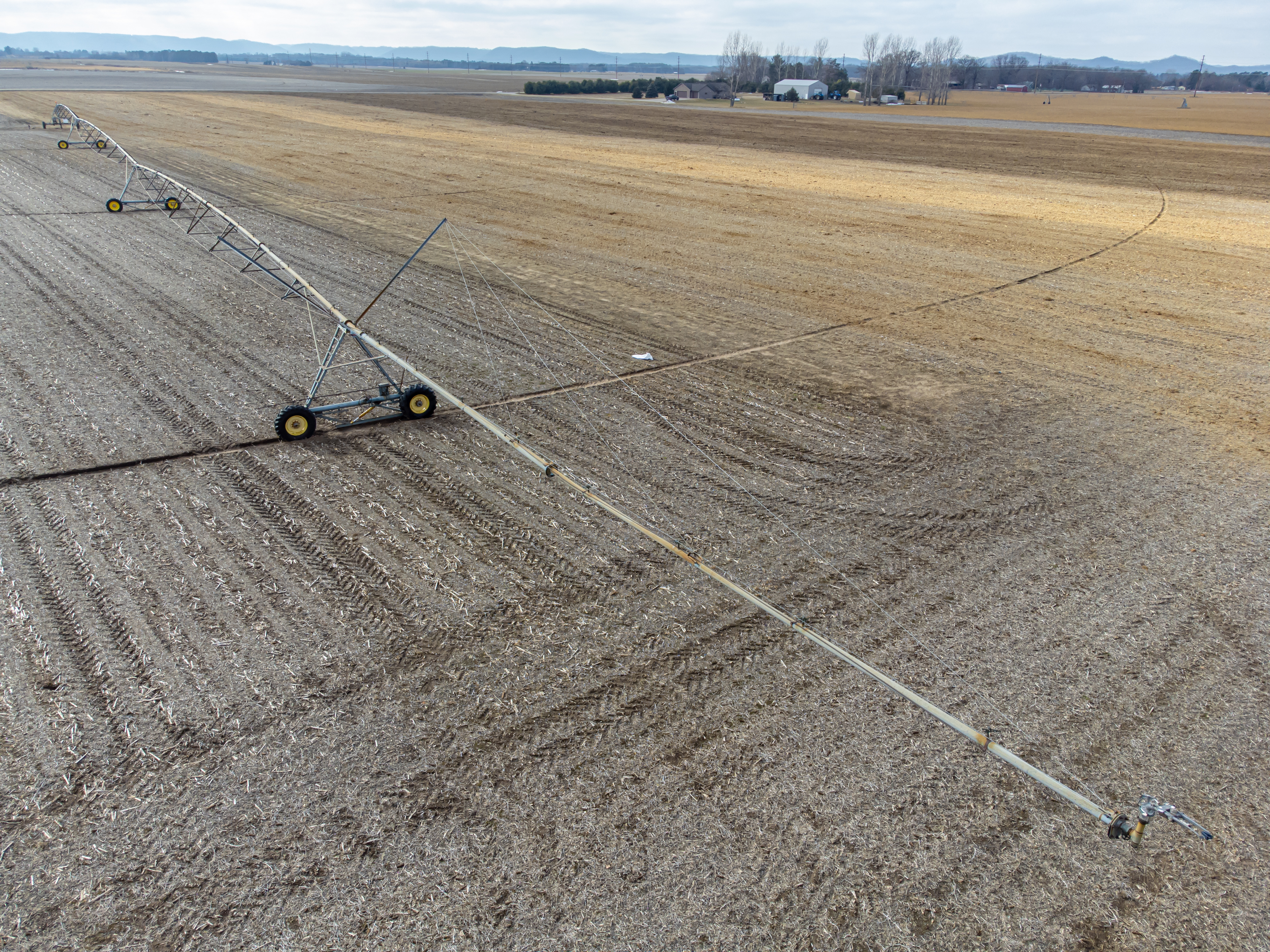
Center-pivot irrigation systems on corn fields in Wisconsin

Center-pivot irrigation is a form of overhead sprinkler irrigation consisting of several segments of pipe (usually galvanized steel or aluminum) with sprinklers positioned along their length, joined together and supported by trusses, and mounted on wheeled towers. The machine moves in a circular pattern and is fed with water from the pivot point at the center of the circle.

For a center pivot to be used, the terrain needs to be reasonably flat; but one major advantage of center pivots over alternative systems that use gravity flow is the ability to function in undulating country. This advantage has resulted in increased irrigated land area and water use in some areas. The system is used in parts of the United States, Australia, New Zealand, Brazil, and in desert areas such as the Sahara and the Middle East.

Center pivots are typically less than 500 meters (1,600 ft) in length (circle radius), with the most common size being the standard 400-meter (1/4 mi) machine, which covers about 50 hectares (125 acres) of land.

Center-pivot irrigation nozzles

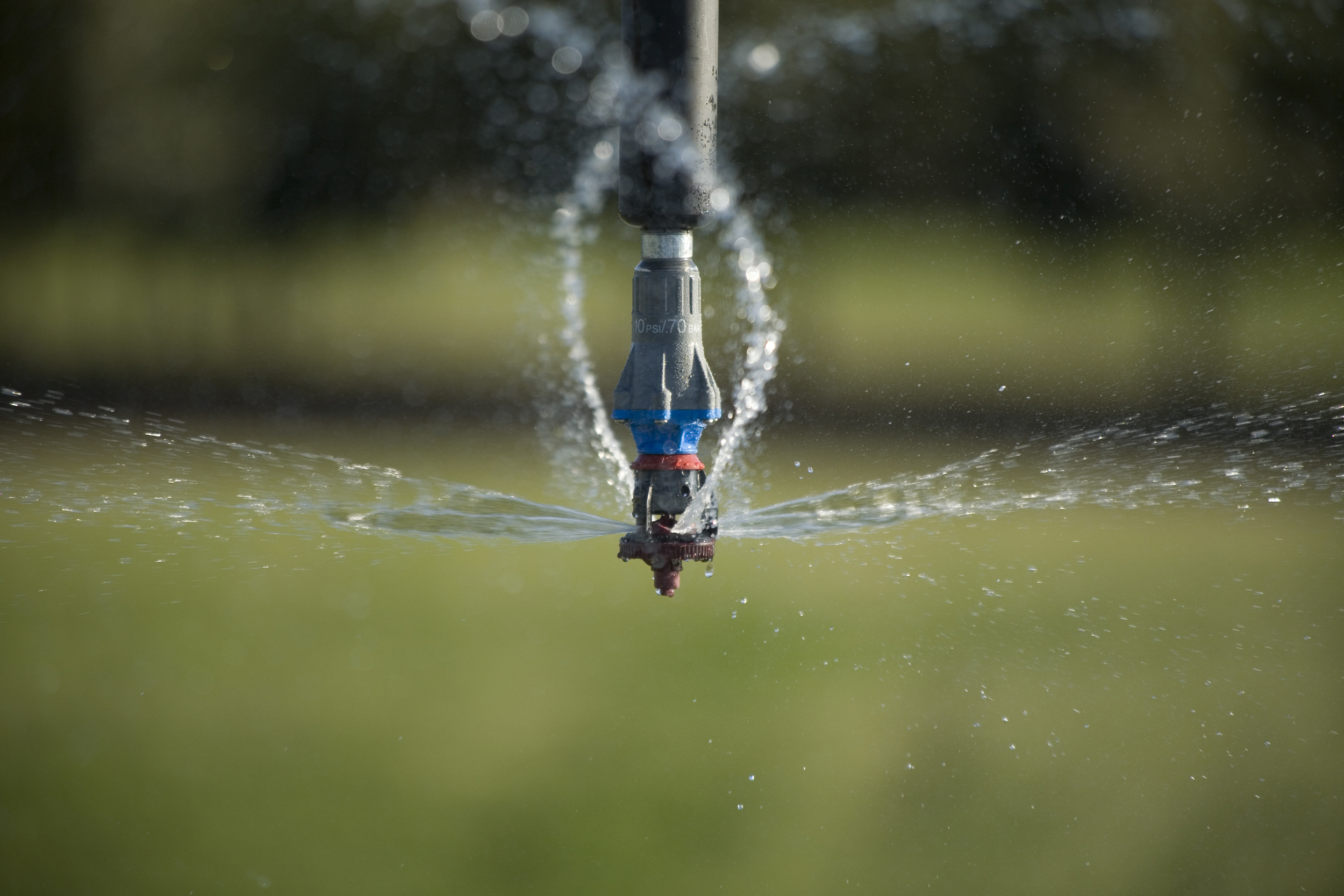
Rotator-style sprinkler

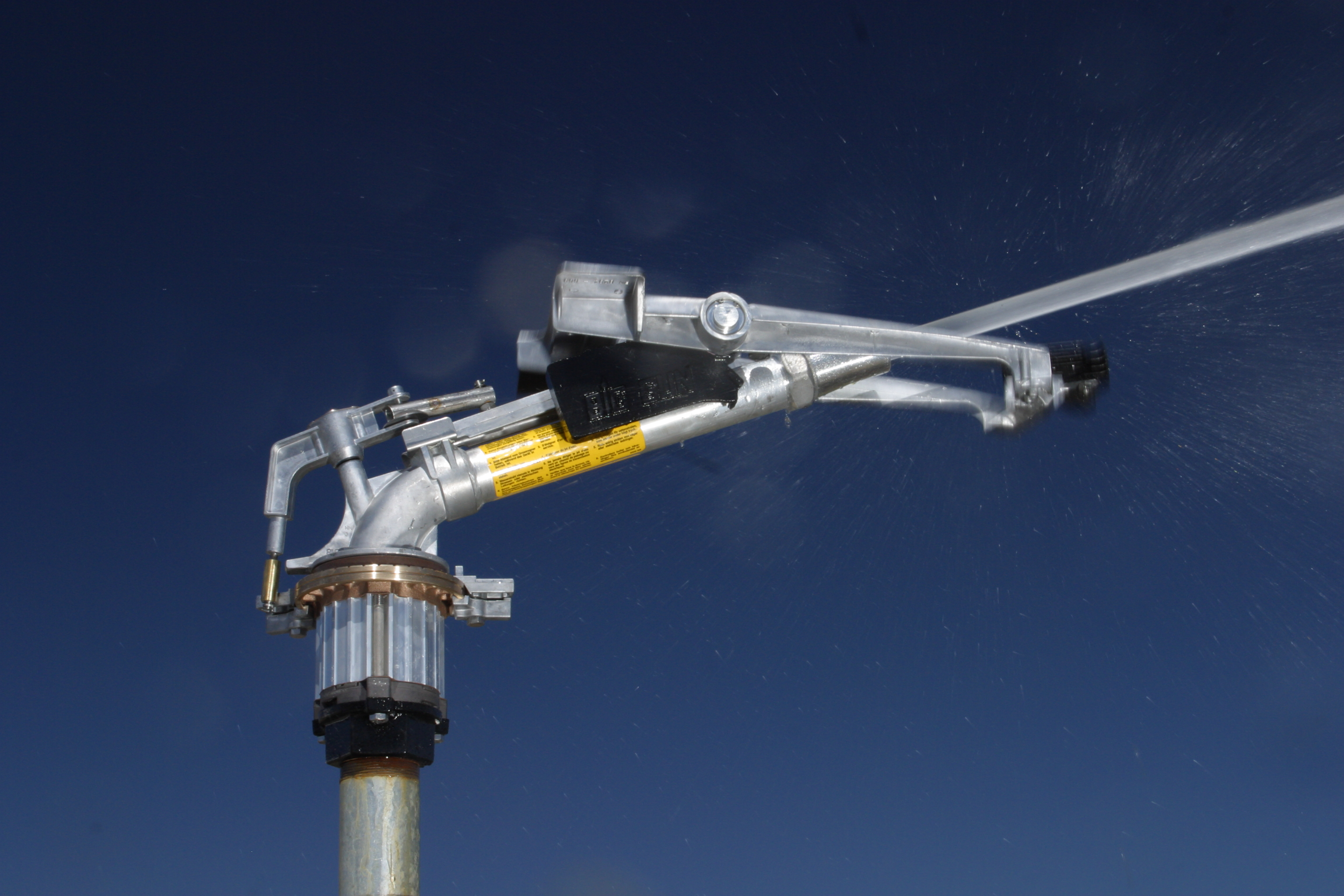
End-gun–style sprinkler

Originally, most center pivots were water-powered. These were replaced by hydraulic systems and electric motor-driven systems, usually driven by a motor mounted at each tower.

The outside set of wheels sets the pace for the rotation. The inner sets of wheels are mounted at hubs between two segments and use angle sensors (microswitches) to detect when the bend at the joint exceeds a certain threshold. When the angle is too large, the wheels rotate to keep the segments aligned. Typical periods for a full rotation include three days; while other sources have the outer edge of the structure moving at 2 to 3 m (6.6 to 9.8 ft) per minute, which would equate to 14 to 21 hours for one full rotation of a 400-meter-radius (1/4 mi) system.

To achieve uniform application, center pivots require a variable emitter flow rate across the radius of the machine. Since the outer-most spans (or towers) travel farther in a given time period than the innermost spans, nozzle sizes are smallest at the inner spans and increase with distance from the pivot point. Aerial views show fields of circles created by tracings of quarter-mile or half-mile (400 or 800 m) radial irrigation pipes, which consume up to several thousands of gallons per minute."

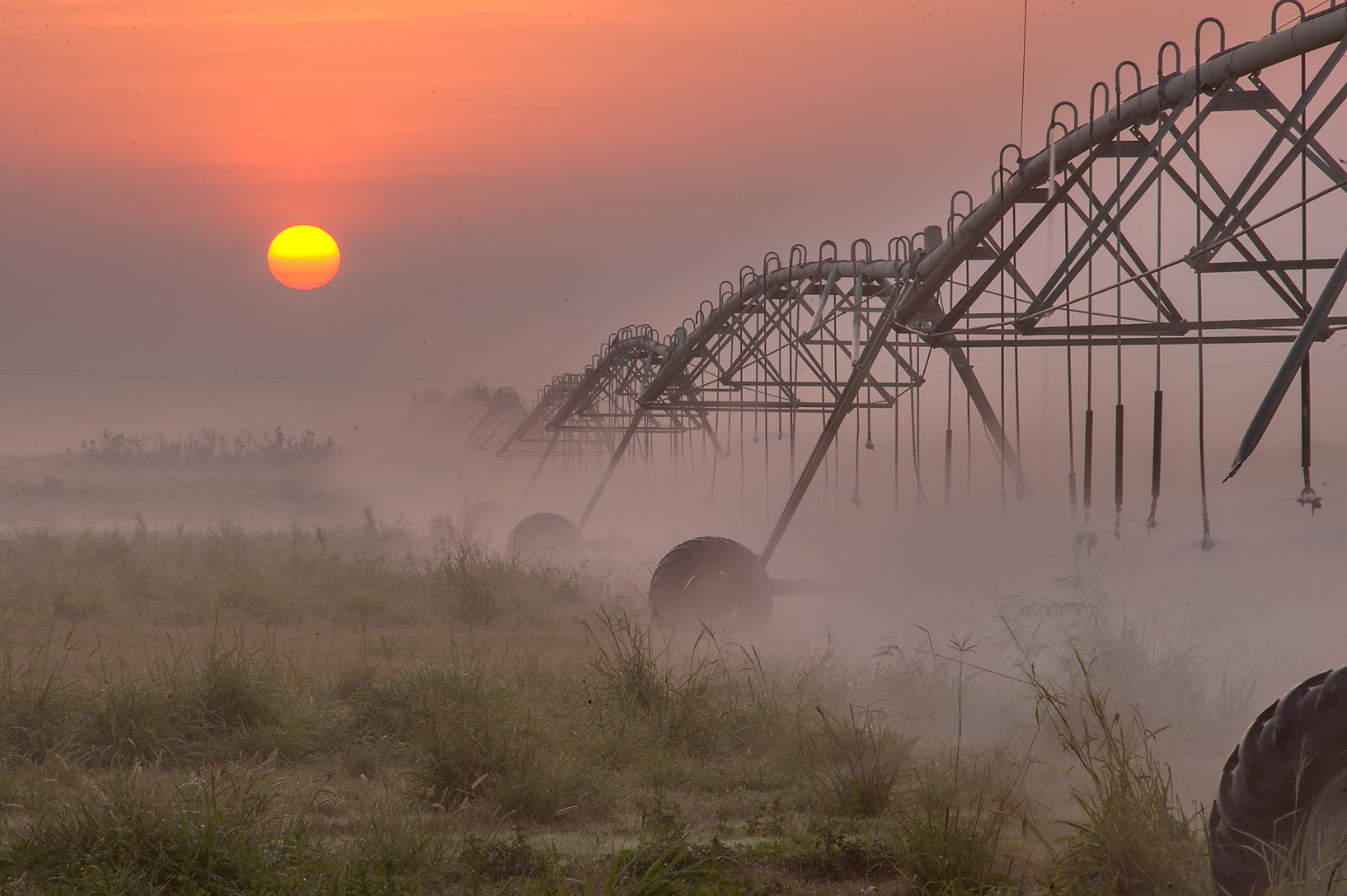
Center-pivot irrigation at Irkhaya Farms in Al Rayyan, Qatar

Most center-pivot systems now have drops hanging from a U-shaped pipe called a gooseneck attached at the top of the pipe with sprinkler heads that are positioned a few feet (at most) above the crop, thus limiting evaporative losses and wind drift. There are many different nozzle configurations available including static plate, moving plate and part circle. Pressure regulators are typically installed upstream of each nozzle to ensure each is operating at the correct design pressure.

Drops can also be used with drag hoses or bubblers that deposit the water directly on the ground between crops. This type of system is known as LEPA (Low Energy Precision Application) and is often associated with the construction of small dams along the furrow length (termed furrow diking/dyking). Crops may be planted either in straight rows or in circles to conform to the travel of the irrigation system.

== Linear or lateral move irrigation machines ==
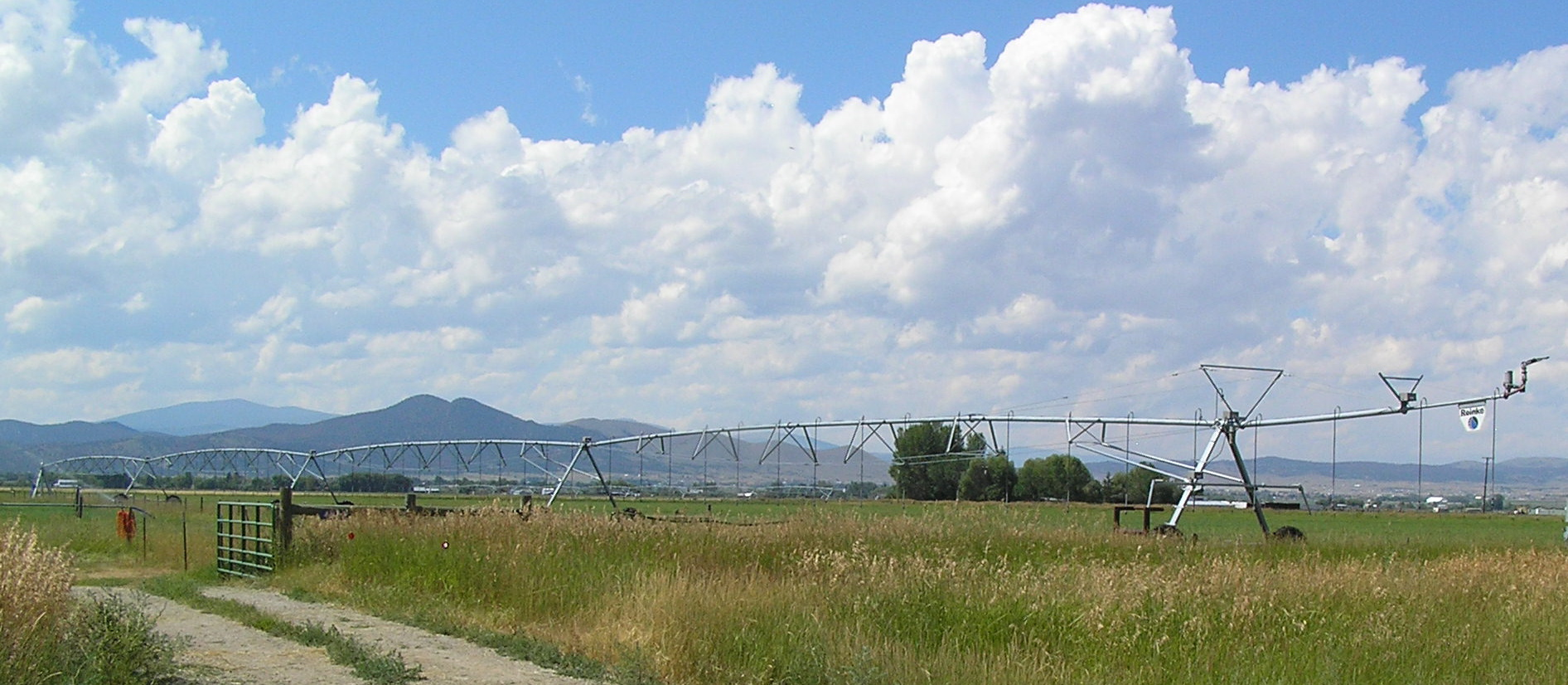
A small center pivot system from beginning to end

Irrigation equipment can also be configured to move in a straight line, where it is termed a lateral move, linear move, wheel move or side-roll irrigation system. In these systems the water is supplied by an irrigation channel running the length of the field. The channel is positioned either at one side or in a line through the center. The motor and pump equipment are mounted on a cart by the supply channel. The cart travels with the machine.

Farmers might choose lateral-move irrigation to keep existing rectangular fields. This can help them convert from furrow irrigation. Lateral-move irrigation is far less common, relies on more complex guidance systems, and requires additional management compared to center pivot irrigation. Lateral-move irrigation is common in Australia. There, systems are usually between 500 and 1,000 meters long.

== Benefits ==
Center-pivot irrigation uses less labor than many other surface irrigation methods, such as furrow irrigation. It also has lower labor costs than ground-irrigation techniques that require digging of channels. Also, center-pivot irrigation can reduce the amount of soil tillage. Therefore, it helps reduce water runoff and soil erosion that can occur with ground irrigation. Less tillage also encourages more organic materials and crop residue to decompose back into the soil. It also reduces soil compaction.

In the United States early settlers of the semiarid High Plains were plagued by crop failures due to cycles of drought, culminating in the disastrous Dust Bowl of the 1930s. Only after World War II when center pivot irrigation became available did the land mass of the High Plains aquifer system transform into one of the most agriculturally productive regions in the world.

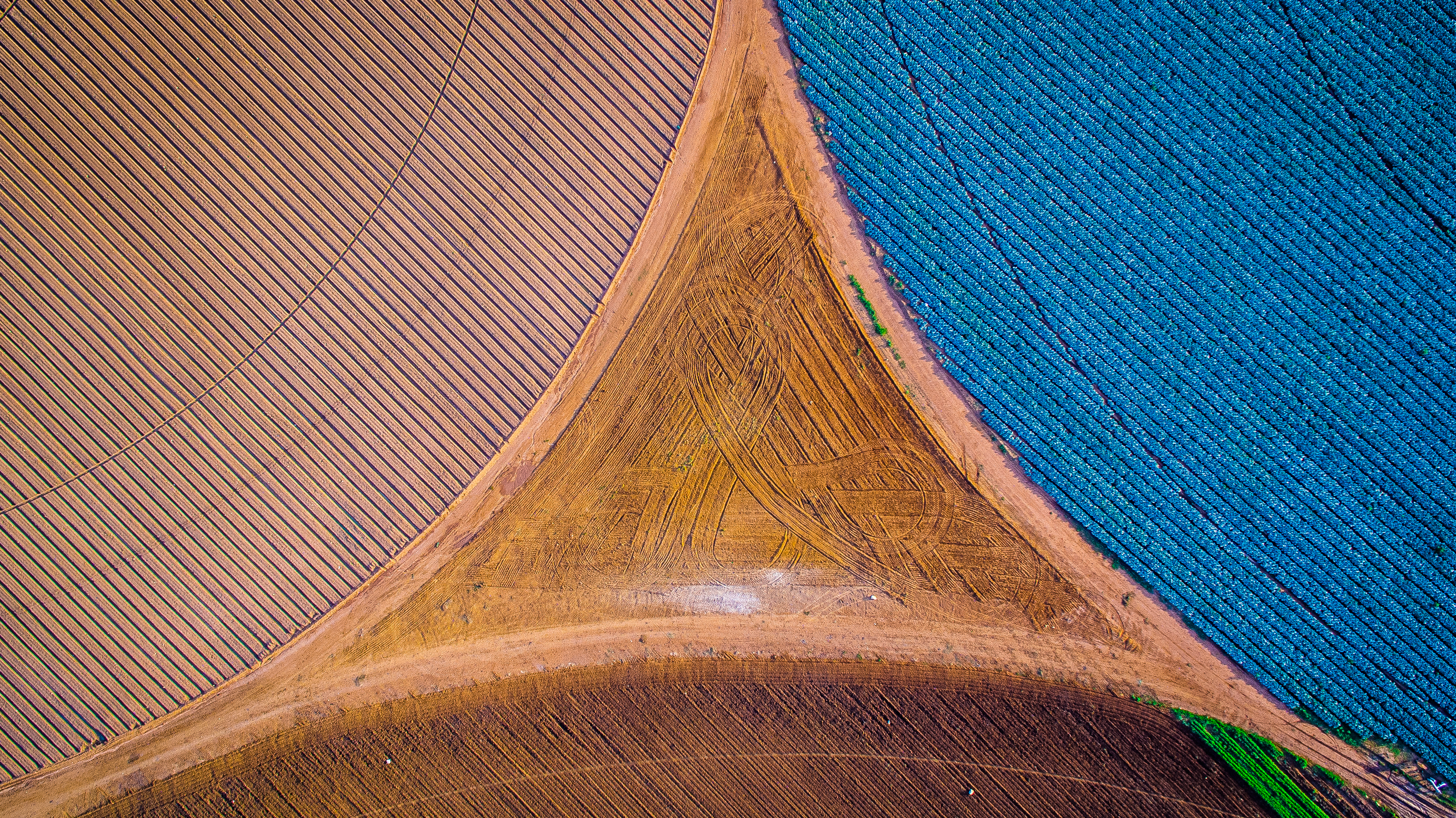
The crops are planted in circles for efficient irrigation.

== Negative effects ==
Groundwater levels decrease when the rate of extraction by irrigation exceeds the rate of recharge. By 2013 it was shown that, counterintuitively, as the water consumption efficiency of center-pivot irrigation improved over the years, farmers planted more intensively, irrigated more land, and grew thirstier crops. This is an example of the Jevons paradox.

In parts of the United States, sixty years of the profitable business of intensive farming using huge center-pivot irrigators has emptied parts of the Ogallala Aquifer (also known as the High Plains Aquifer). One of the world's largest aquifers, it covers an area of approximately 450,000 km^{2} (170,000 sq mi) in portions of the eight states of South Dakota, Nebraska, Wyoming, Colorado, Kansas, Oklahoma, New Mexico, and Texas, beneath the Great Plains in the United States. The total water extraction from center-pivot irrigation in the area is estimated to be about 5.42 million acre-feet per year (6.69 km^{3}/a).

In 1950, irrigated cropland covered 100,000 hectares (250,000 acres). With the use of center-pivot irrigation, nearly 1.2 million hectares (3 million acres) of land were irrigated in Kansas alone. At some places, during maximum extraction, the water table dropped more than 1.5 m (5 ft) per year. In extreme cases, wells had to be greatly deepened to reach the steadily falling water table. In some places in the Texas Panhandle, the water table has been drained (dewatered). "Vast stretches of Texas farmland lying over the aquifer no longer support irrigation. In west-central Kansas, up to a fifth of the irrigated farmland along a 100-mile [160 km] swath of the aquifer has already gone dry." It would take hundreds to thousands of years of rainfall to replace the groundwater in the dried up aquifer.

== Role in culture ==
In the 21st century, recognition of the significance of the High Plains Aquifer has led to increased coverage from regional and international journalists. A May 2013 New York Times article "Wells dry, fertile plains turn to dust" recounts the relentless decline of parts of the High Plains Aquifer System.

Writer Emily Woodson characterized the increased use of the center pivot irrigation system as part of a profound attitude shift towards modernism (expensive tractors, center-pivot irrigation, new pesticides) and away from traditional farming that took place in the mid-1970s and 1980s in the United States. A new generation chose high-risk, high-reward crops such as irrigated corn or peanuts, which require large quantities of groundwater, fertilizer and chemicals. The new family farm corporations turned many pastures into new cropland and were more interested in rising land prices than water conservation.

== See also ==
- Irrigation management
- Irrigation in Saudi Arabia
- Water management
- Fossil water
- Hydrogeology

== Additional sources ==
- Snyder, Cindy (January 18, 2011). "Center pivot irrigation systems cost big bucks". Times-News (Twin Falls, Idaho).
- Becker, Hank (October 2, 2000). "Can Crop Temperature Guide Center-Pivot Irrigation?". USDA Agriculture Research Service.
- Garner, Fay (February 2008). "Tuskegee Turf Farm Battles Drought With More Efficient Irrigation". USDA Natural Resources Conservation Service.
- Boyd, Vicky (February 16, 2012). "Valley Irrigation unveils tire sensor for center-pivot systems". The Grower Magazine. Archived from the original on March 8, 2013.
