= Cone of depression =

Region surrounding a well due to groundwater extraction

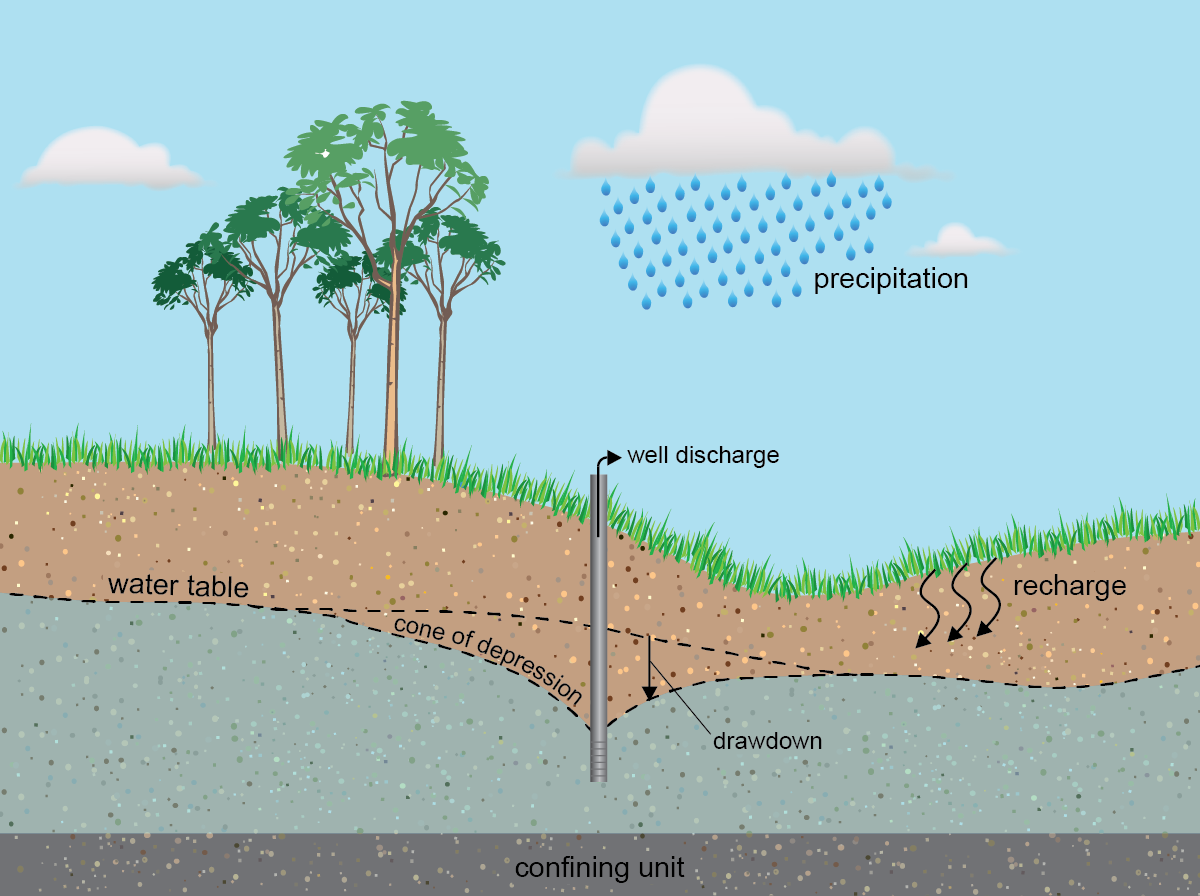
A cone of depression forms around a pumping well.

A cone of depression is a circular area surrounding a well where groundwater levels are reduced from pumping. In an unconfined aquifer (water table), this is an actual depression of the water levels. In confined aquifers (artesian), the cone of depression is a reduction in the pressure head surrounding the pumped well.

When a well is pumped, the water level in the well is lowered. By lowering this water level, a gradient occurs between the water in the surrounding aquifer and the water in the well. Because water flows from high to low water levels or pressure, this gradient produces a flow from the surrounding aquifer into the well.

As the water flows into the well, the water levels or pressure in the aquifer around the well decrease. The amount of this decline becomes less with distance from the well, resulting in a cone-shaped depression radiating away from the well. This, in appearance, is similar to the effect one sees when the plug is pulled from a bathtub. This conical-shaped feature is the cone of depression.

== Physical properties ==
The size and shape (slope) of the cone of depression depends on many factors. The pumping rate in the well will affect the size of the cone. Also, the type of aquifer material, such as whether the aquifer is sand, silt, fractured rocks, karst, etc., also will affect how far the cone extends. The amount of water in storage and the thickness of the aquifer also will determine the size and shape of the cone of depression.

As a well is pumped, the cone of depression will extend out and will continue to expand in a radial fashion until a point of equilibrium occurs. This usually is when the amount of water released from storage equals the rate of pumping. This also can occur when recharge to the aquifer equals the amount of water being pumped.

Cones of depression's are typically thought as being a circular feature surrounding the pumped well. However, aquifer characteristics can affect the shape of the cone of depression. For example, if there is a steep ground-water gradient in the area of pumpage, the cone will tend to be shorter in the upgradient direction and elongated in the downgradient direction. This is because the water is already flowing towards the well from the upgradient direction, so the cone of depression does not need to extend as far out to obtain water, whereas the water is flowing away from the well in the downgradient direction, so the cone of depression needs to reach further to obtain water.

The shape of the cone of depression also can be affected when the cone intersects a source of water, such as a lake or stream. In such cases, water from the lake or stream supplies water to the cone of depression and therefore the cone will not expand as far in this direction. Conversely, if the cone of depression contacts a barrier, such as massive bedrock ridge, a clay body, or the edge of the aquifer, the cone of depression will decline to greater depths in order to supply water to the well.

When two cones of depression intersect one another, they tend to have a combined effect on drawdown and result in water levels or pressures much lower than a single cone of depression would produce. This can be an important consideration when planning well placement and pumping rates. In the case of water supply wells, whether for domestic use or irrigation, wells typically are placed far enough apart in order to avoid intersecting cones of depression. This way, drawdown in the aquifer is minimized. However, in the case of dewatering for mines and landfills where the goal is to lower water levels and pressures, wells often are placed close together in order to reduce head in the aquifer to the maximum amount.

== Analysis and utility ==
Contour maps of water levels and pressures often show “bulls-eyes” around pumped wells that represent cones of depression. With large municipal wells, cones of depression can extend many miles from the well. For domestic wells, the cones are often too small to show up on such maps.

Cones of depression can be very useful when dealing with contaminant plumes in ground water. Often, a well can be placed near a contaminant plume and pumped at a sufficient rate to create a cone of depression. This cone of depression can act to capture the contaminant flow (essentially pulling it out of the aquifer). The pumped water can then be treated. The use of capture wells has been helpful in protecting water supply wells and for isolating contaminants near spills, landfills, and other sources.

== See also ==
- Overdrafting
