= Irrigation in Saudi Arabia =

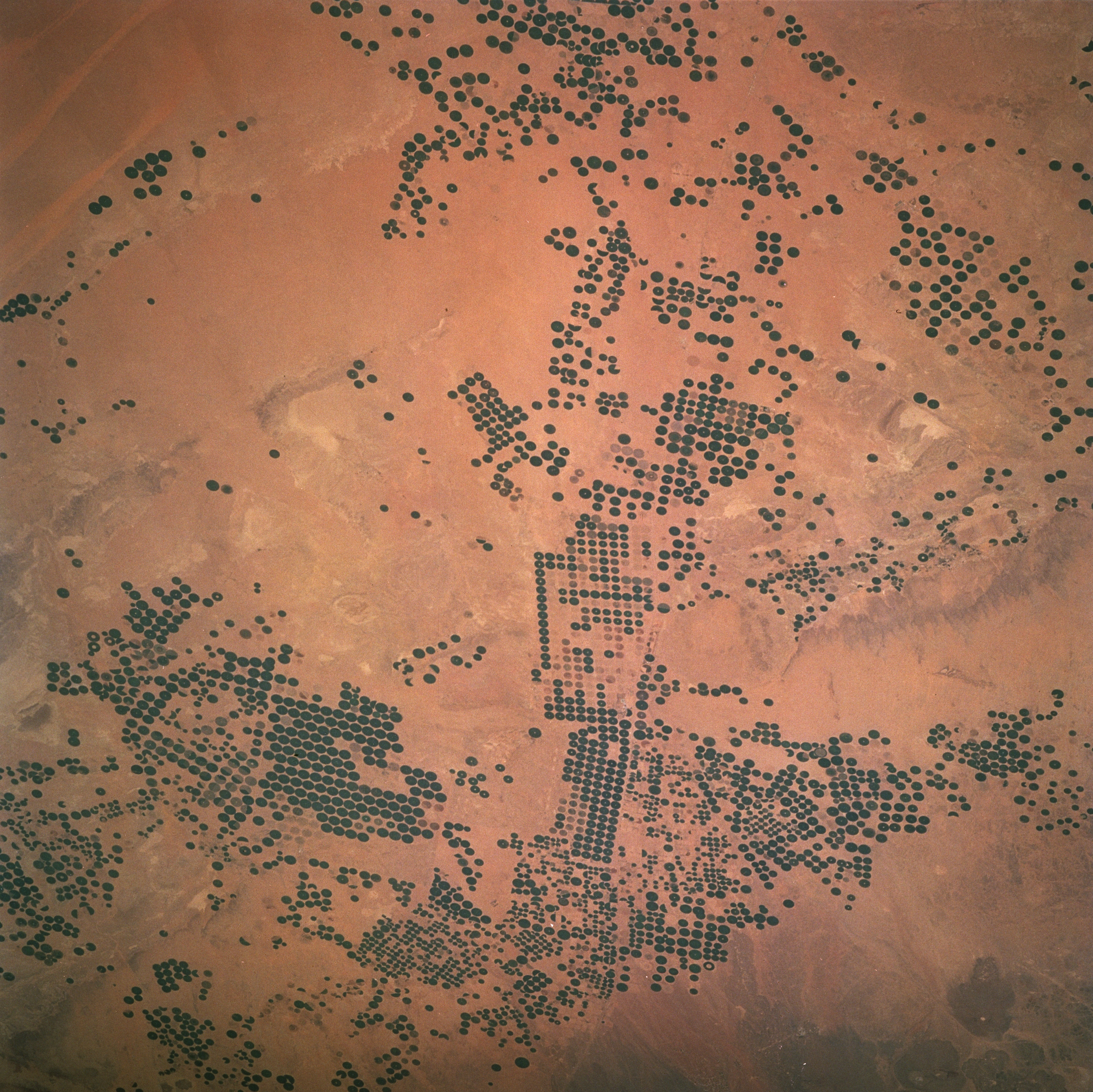
Circles of green irrigated vegetation in Saudi Arabia, April 1997

Center pivot irrigation in Saudi Arabia is typical of many isolated irrigation projects scattered throughout the arid and hyper-arid regions of the Earth. Nonrenewable fossil water is mined from depths as great as 1 km (3,000 ft), pumped to the surface, and distributed via large center pivot irrigation feeds. The circles of green irrigated vegetation may comprise a variety of agricultural commodities from alfalfa to wheat. Diameters of the normally circular fields range from a few hundred meters to as much as 3 km (1.9 mi).

The projects often trace out a narrow, sinuous, and seemingly random path. Actually, engineers generally seek ancient river channels now buried by the sand seas. The fossil waters mined in these projects accumulated during periods of wetter climate in the Pleistocene glacial epochs, between 10,000 and 2 million years ago, and are not being replenished under current climatic conditions. The projects, therefore, will have limited production as the reservoirs are drained.

Saudi Arabia is the third most water-stressed country in the world.

A network of dams has been built to trap and use precious seasonal floods. Vast underground water reservoirs have been tapped through deep wells. Desalination plants have been built to produce fresh water from the sea for urban and industrial use, thereby freeing other sources for agriculture. Facilities have also been put into place to treat urban and industrial run-off for agricultural irrigation. These efforts collectively have helped transform vast tracts of the desert into fertile farmland. Land under cultivation grew from under 400,000 acres (1,600 km^{2}) in 1976 to more than 8 million acres (32,000 km^{2}) in 1993.

Saudi Arabia is suffering from a major depletion of the water in its underground aquifers and a resultant break down and disintegration of its agriculture as a consequence. As a result of the catastrophe, Saudi Arabia has bought agricultural land in the United States, Argentina, and Africa. Saudi Arabia ranked as a major buyer of agricultural land in foreign countries.

== International Cooperation ==
The cooperation between the Saudi Irrigation Organization (SIO) and Food and Agriculture Organization (FAO) is based on strengthening national capacities in irrigation systems' management and improving water-use efficiency in the agricultural sector through technical and advisory collaboration. This partnership aims to promote the adoption of efficient irrigation technologies, develop a national code for irrigation practices, assess and improve the performance of irrigation networks and canals, and implement training programs and awareness sessions for farmers and agricultural sector personnel on modern irrigation technologies and sustainable practices. This cooperation has been reflected through the launch of intensive training programs and the organization of joint field visits to review projects and initiatives aimed at rationalizing water consumption and enhancing agricultural productivity.

== See also ==
- Desert farming
- Peak water
- Environmental impact of irrigation
- Water politics in the Middle East
