= Interflow =

In hydrology, interflow is the lateral movement of water in the unsaturated zone, or vadose zone, that returns to the surface or enters a stream. Interflow is sometimes used interchangeably with throughflow; however, throughflow is specifically the subcomponent of interflow that returns to the surface, as overland flow, prior to entering a stream or becoming groundwater. Interflow occurs when water infiltrates (see infiltration (hydrology)) into the subsurface, hydraulic conductivity decreases with depth, and lateral flow proceeds downslope. As water accumulates in the subsurface, saturation may occur, and interflow may exfiltrate as return flows, becoming overland flow.
