= Nested wells =

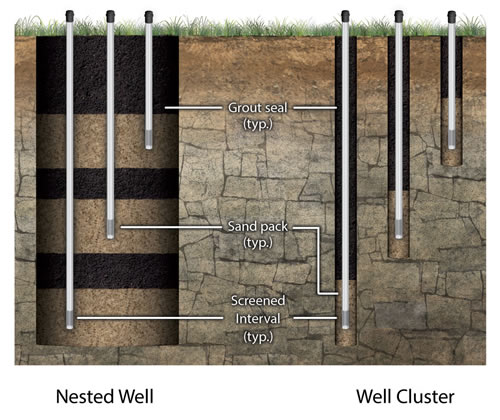
Nested well and well cluster (adapted from Johnson [1983])

Nested wells, also referred to as nested monitoring wells, are composed of multiple tubes or pipes, typically terminating with short screened intervals (2–3 ft), installed in single boreholes. Sand packs must be installed at the screen depths and seals in the borehole are constructed between the sand packs. Nested wells are different from well clusters in that the latter consists of a cluster of wells where tubes or pipes are constructed in separate, individual boreholes that are drilled and completed at different depths.

When constructing nested wells, attention must be paid to ensure the proper placement of sand in the screened intervals and bentonite between monitored intervals, by measuring the depth of the sand or bentonite frequently as the materials are being placed. However, if the seals are placed to the exact depths specified in the well design, riser casings that are touching due to de-centralization in the borehole inhibits seal placement between the risers and can allow for vertical movement of groundwater within the borehole between different monitoring zones. The likelihood of vertical leakage through the bentonite seals of a nested well increases with the number of separate casings within the borehole, or when only a small thickness of annular seal exists between the various monitored zones.

It is for these reasons that the installation of nested wells is discouraged or prohibited by some governmental or regulatory agencies.

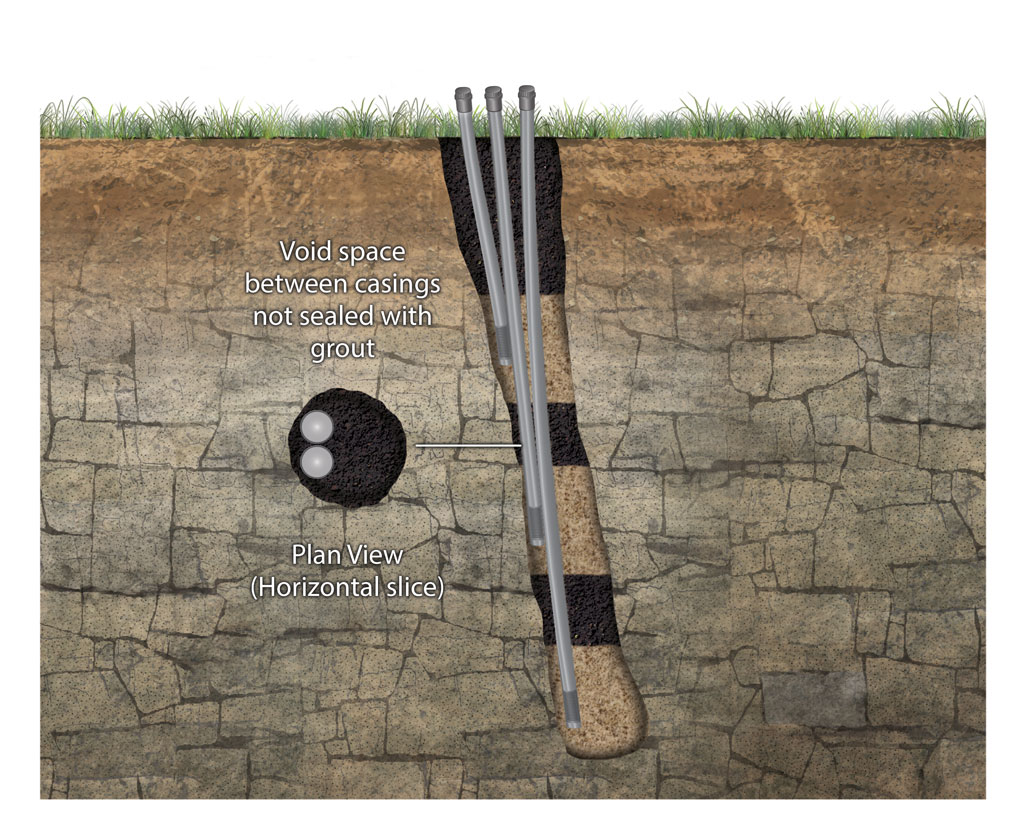
Nested wells installation without centralizers may result in imperfect seals between monitored zones

Successful installation of nested wells has been reported by the U.S. Geological Survey in deep (several hundreds to over one thousand feet), large diameter boreholes (≥12 in), with multiple casings (monitoring zones), resulting in seals that are several tens to hundreds of feet thick. This work illustrates that nested wells can be useful to monitor discrete zones separated by thick borehole seals.

However, nested wells are not recommended for contaminant hydrogeology monitoring mainly because it is generally not possible to obtain enough monitoring intervals in a nested well without compromising the seals between intervals. Further, it is often difficult to conclusively determine if a seal has failed in a nested well. Alternatives to nested wells are engineered nested wells or multilevel monitoring systems that are designed to provide robust annular seals along with the ability to collect groundwater samples and measure hydraulic heads at many discrete depths in a single well.
