= Well cluster =

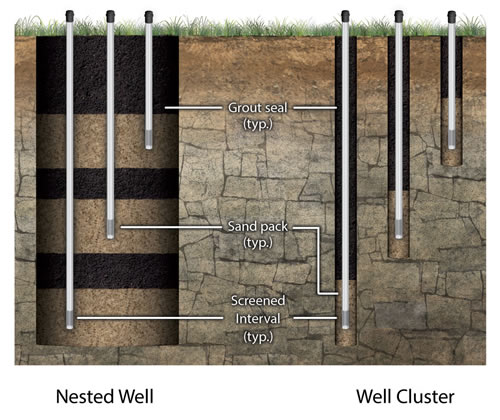
Nested well and well cluster (adapted from Johnson [1983])

A well cluster, also referred to as a monitoring well cluster, consists of multiple co-located monitoring wells that are constructed with intakes (well screens) at different depths in the subsurface. The purpose of a well cluster is to provide groundwater samples from discrete depths at approximately the same location, and/or to measure the vertical pressure gradient to calculate the vertical component of groundwater flow. Water levels can be measured in each individual monitoring well, providing vertical profiles of groundwater pressure (hydraulic head). The pressure difference between the groundwater table and the potentiometric surface in a submerged well can. A shallow well is used to measure the water table, and is equilibrated to atmospheric pressure. A deeper well, or piezometer, measured the potentiometric surface, determined by the water level observed when submerged and sealed. The associated change in pressure between the shallow well and piezometer, and the corresponding length, usually taken as the distance between the center of the two well screens, can be applied to Darcy's Law to calculate the vertical groundwater flow.

Well clusters are different from nested wells in that each monitoring well is constructed in a separate borehole, as opposed to multiple well casings in a single borehole which is the case with nested wells). A key advantage of a well cluster over a nested well is that there is less potential for vertical leakage and hydraulic short-circuiting because reliable annular seals are installed in each separate borehole in the cluster. However, well clusters require drilling multiple boreholes, which results in higher construction costs compared to nested wells. Economical alternatives to well clusters are multilevel groundwater monitoring systems, also referred to as engineered nested wells.
