= Multilevel groundwater monitoring systems =

Multilevel Groundwater Monitoring Systems, also referred to as Multi-Depth Groundwater Monitoring Systems, Multilevel Systems (MLSs), or Engineered Nested Wells, are engineered technologies installed in single boreholes above and/or below the water table to obtain data from different depth intervals. The technologies may consist of various pipes, liners, access ports, sampling pumps, pressure sensors, and sealing mechanisms that are installed temporarily or permanently in boreholes drilled into unconsolidated sediments or bedrock.

MLS systems facilitate 1) ongoing measurement and monitoring of depth-discrete water pressures (hydraulic heads) and 2) repeated collection of depth-discrete groundwater samples for chemical testing. Commercial MLS systems are available with as few as three ports (CMT System) to more than 20 ports (MP Westbay and Solinst Waterloo Systems). An essential design element of all MLS systems is that they must prevent hydraulic connection of the various monitored intervals within the wellbore.

While installed primarily in water-saturated sediments and rock, MLS systems can also be installed in the vadose zone for the collection of depth-discrete soil gas samples. Hybrid MLS systems can be constructed with some ports in the vadose zone and some ports in the saturated zone.

== History ==
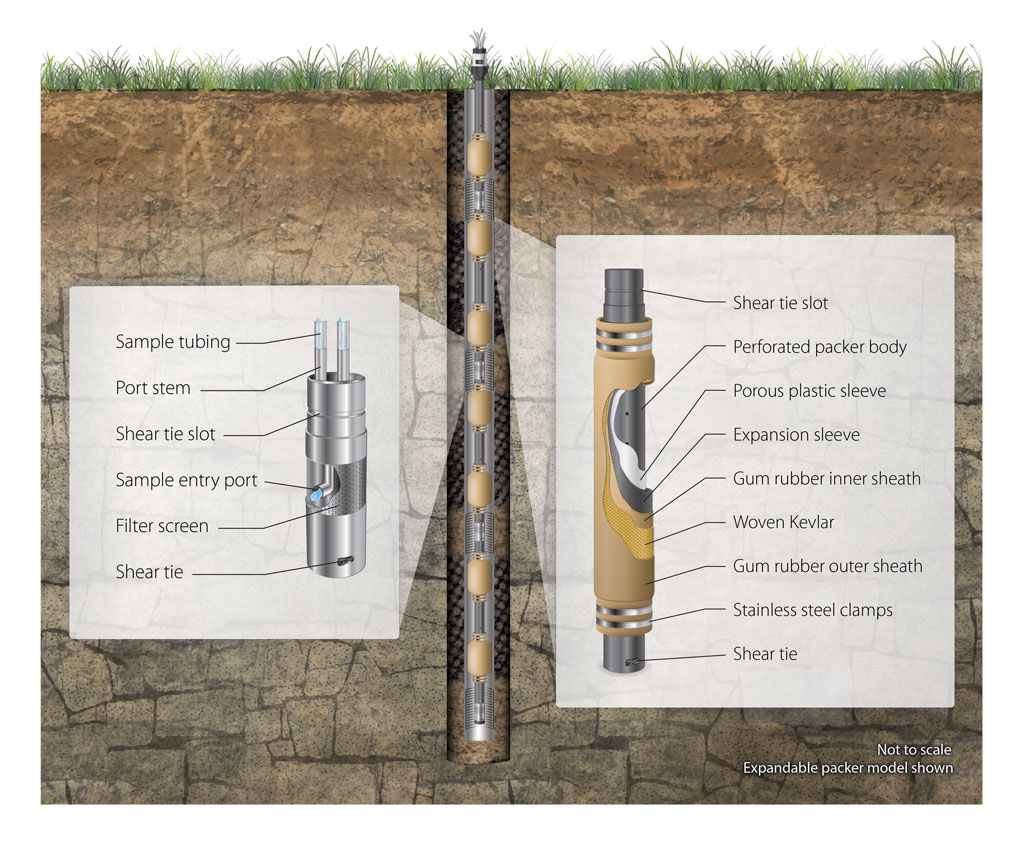
Waterloo Multilevel Systems use modular components to form a sealed casing string of various casing lengths, packers, and ports. Monitoring instruments and tubes attach to the stem of each port individually, organized by a wellhead manifold at surface.

Prior to the 1970s, collection of discrete groundwater samples from multiple depths in the subsurface required the installation of well clusters or nested wells . Well clusters consist of a closely spaced group of monitoring wells, each well completed to a different depth in individual boreholes. Well clusters were first used in the 1950s at contaminated sites. Because there is only one well screen in each borehole, there is little risk of vertical connection between zones. The individual wells in the cluster must be installed near one another (e.g., ≤10 ft. apart), so that the head data obtained from them is a result of variations in the vertical head and not horizontal gradients. Also, care must be taken to avoid installing clusters of wells with overlapping screens and sand packs – this may allow vertical movement of contamination between the wells in the presence of vertical hydraulic gradients. Installation of wells clusters can be expensive because of increased drilling costs associated with drilling multiple borings, especially in fractured rock.

Nested wells are wells constructed of two or more well screens and casing assemblies of different lengths installed in a single borehole. The key drawback of nested wells is that it can be difficult to effectively seal the portions of the borehole between the monitored zones. Nested wells were popular in the 1970s but many seal failures occurred. For this reason, nested wells are discouraged or prohibited in many areas. There are typically three separate monitoring intervals in nested wells, although more monitoring intervals have been constructed in very deep monitoring wells. The risk of hydraulically connecting the various monitoring zones is inversely proportional to the thickness of the seals between the monitoring intervals. Thus, shallow nested wells with many monitoring zones are more at risk of hydraulic failure than deep nested wells with fewer monitoring zones.

Because of the limitations of well clusters and nested wells and a desire for monitoring more vertical intervals, researchers at the University of Waterloo (Canada) developed a MLS to collect depth-discrete groundwater samples at a landfill site in Ontario, Canada (Pickens et al. 1978). That system, which contained multiple tubes within an outer PVC pipe, was subsequently commercialized as the Solinst Waterloo system. Further improvements to that system included the addition of packers to hydraulically isolate the monitoring intervals.

In the early 1980s, researchers used multiple gas-drive pumps installed at different depths in boreholes to collect depth-discrete groundwater samples in a fractured rock aquifer. A commercial version of this gas-drive system, named "Barcad" after its inventors, is available from BESST, Inc.

In the mid-1980s, an MLS consisting of multiple ports separated by blank casings was developed. That system, referred to as the Westbay MP system, utilizes a separate tool lowered into the MLS on a wireline to measure aquifer pressures and collect groundwater samples. The Westbay MP System is commercially available from Nova Metrix.

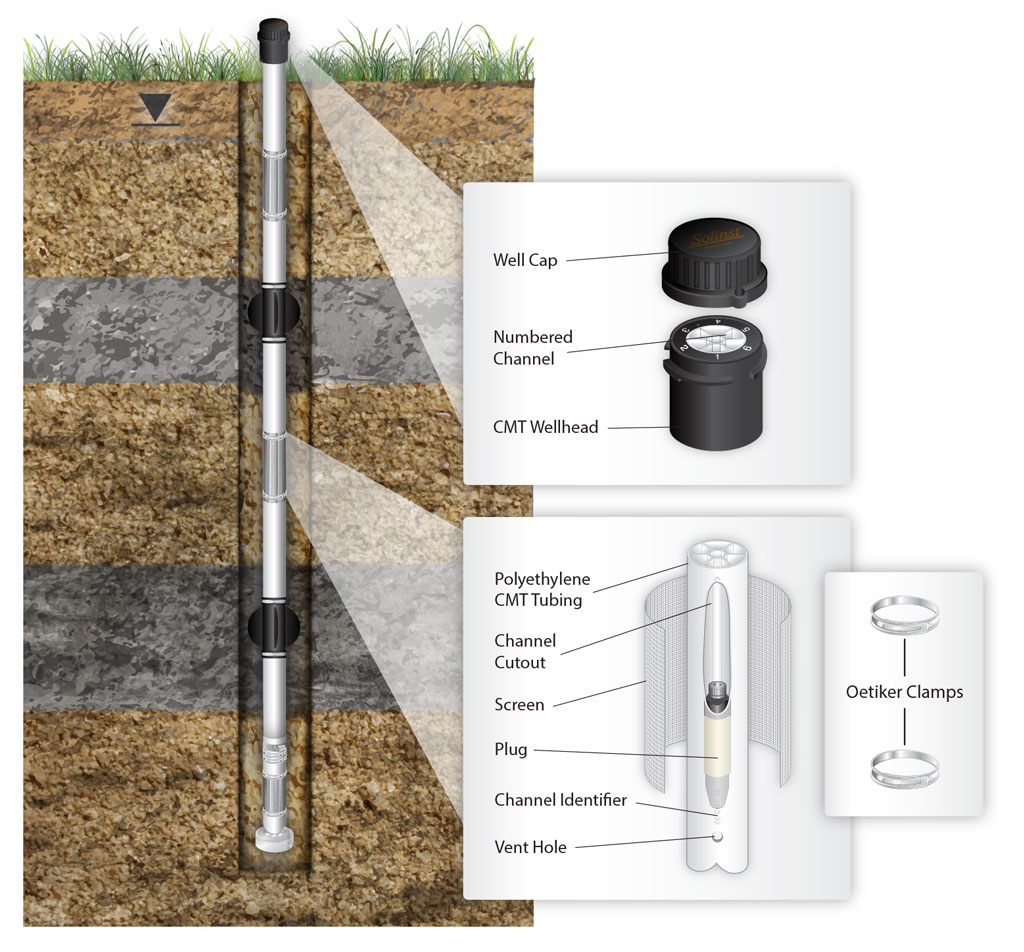
Typical 3 or 7-channel CMT installation using layers of bentonite and sand backfilled from surface

In the late 1980s, researchers in Israel developed a well insert consisting of multiple diffusion cells that could be inserted into a conventional monitoring well to develop vertical profiles of target solute concentrations. This system is not commercially available.

In the early 1990s, a team from Science and Engineering Associates, Inc. (SEA) with Argonne National Laboratories developed an instrumentation and fluid sampler emplacement technique for in-situ characterization and fluid monitoring in the vadose zone. Referred to as SEAMIST™, the system was constructed of a flexible liner that was everted into an open borehole. Sand was poured into the everting liner during construction to deploy it to the full depth of the borehole. The sand also acted to keep the liner pressed against the borehole walls. Various sensors and sampling devices could be ported through the liner where they were pressed against the borehole). Mr. Carl Keller acquired the manufacturing rights to the system in 1995 and developed a version that could be deployed below the water table for depth-discrete groundwater monitoring. Referred to as the Water FLUTe (Flexible Liner Underground Technology), the system is commercially available from FLUTe, Inc.

In the late 1990s, Murray Einarson, working for Precision Sampling, Inc. in California, developed a continuous multichannel tubing (CMT) system for monitoring up to seven different zones in the subsurface. Development and testing of the CMT system was the focus of Einarson's MSc thesis at the University of Waterloo. The CMT system consists of a continuous length of polyethylene tubing that has seven internal channels or lumens. Custom-designed monitoring zones are created on site by cutting ports into the various channels at specific depths. The CMT MLS is commercially available from Solinst Canada.

== Advantages ==
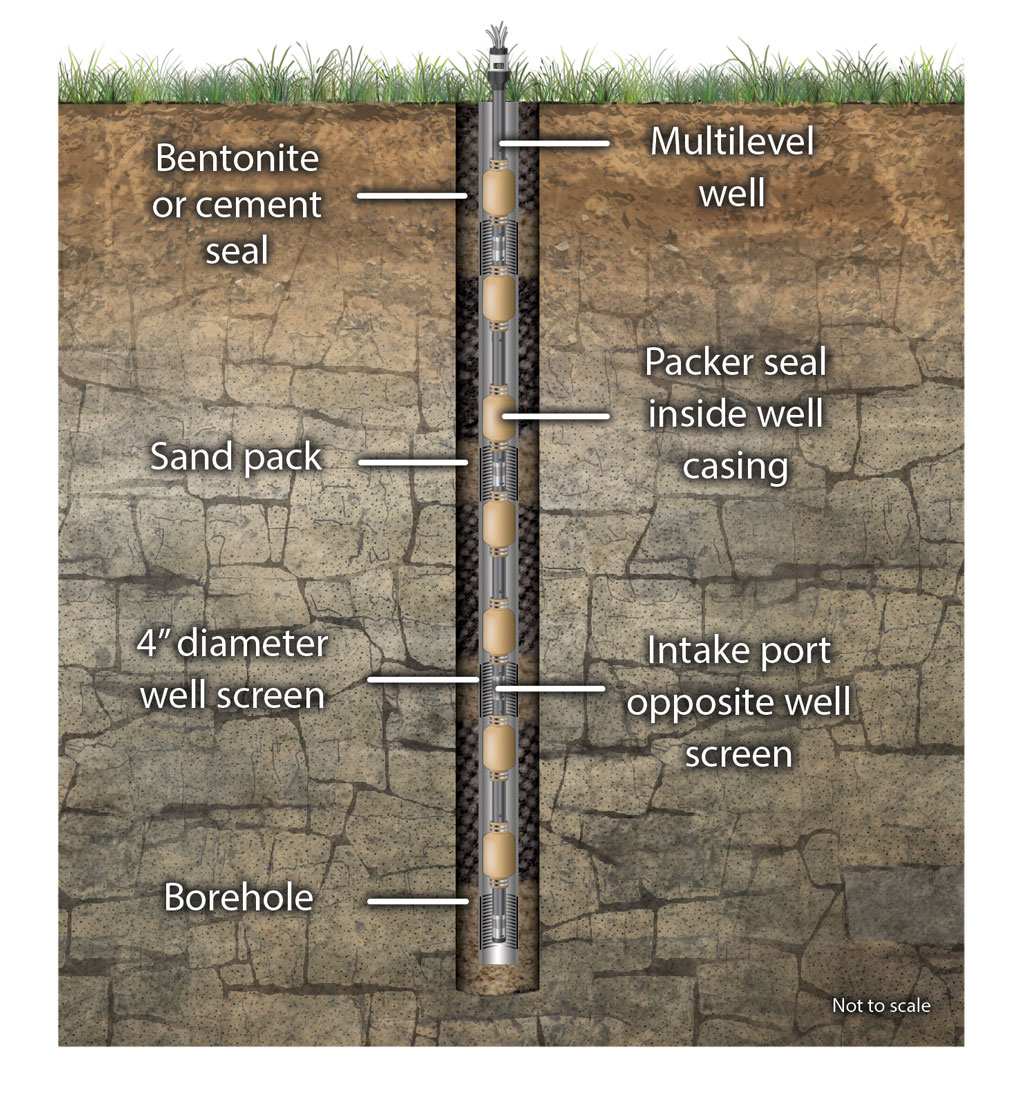
Waterloo Multilevel System installation within a permanent 4" casing and screen string using typical sand and bentonite/cement placement methods.

Multilevel systems offer the following advantages over clusters of monitoring wells and nested monitoring wells:

- Only one casing (or tube) is placed in the borehole. This simplifies the process of installing annular seals between the monitored zones and improves the reliability of the seals.
- A MLS facilitates the collection of ground-water samples and measurement of hydraulic heads from many more discrete depths than can be obtained using typical well clusters or nests.
- A MLS facilitates the collection of subsurface head and chemical data over time, which is something that cannot be accomplished using "one-time" profiling tools like CPT or the Waterloo Profiler.
- A single MLS has a much smaller "footprint" at the ground surface and therefore creates less surface disturbance than a cluster of individual wells. A single MLS is therefore less noticeable and obtrusive than a cluster of wells.
- The cost of one MLS with several monitoring intervals is generally much less than the cost of an equivalent cluster of wells except in shallow, soft geological deposits where direct push techniques can be used to install many wells quickly. In some areas, permits may be required for each well in a cluster. This can significantly increase the cost of a cluster of monitoring wells.

All of the components of multilevel systems are manufactured with stringent QA/QC standards and there are detailed established procedures for MLS installation and for testing the MLS after installation. Each MLS is an engineered system reproducible from site to site. In contrast, nested wells have no standards for the components and the installation procedures typically vary depending on the well installer.

MLSs have the following disadvantages relative to conventional monitoring wells (adapted from Einarson, 2006):

- Fewer options exist for collecting water samples because conventional sampling pumps generally do not fit down the smaller MLS tubes or are otherwise unsuitable; this means that collection of large volumes of groundwater may be time-consuming and impractical for some types of MLSs;
- Owing to the specialized nature of the MLS components and monitoring tools, some specialized training or technical assistance may be required, at least initially;
- Some types of MLSs are more difficult to decommission than conventional or nested wells; and
- The flow restrictions in the internal components (i.e., the plumbing) of MLSs makes them generally less suitable or versatile for conducting hydraulic tests to measure permeability and storativity.

== Installation methods ==
Multilevel Monitoring Systems are typically installed in one of three ways:

- Open hole completion: the MLS is inserted down a completely open borehole with no casing, except perhaps a surficial casing through overburden into the top of bedrock. This installation method only works in intact rock or in borings drilled in overburden that stay open when the drill bit and rods are removed. This installation method runs the risk of cave in or blockage occurring during installation that may jeopardize the positioning of the sand packs and seals. The risk of borehole collapse is reduced when the borehole is filled with drilling fluid. However, installations of MLS systems in boreholes filled with drilling fluids require more vigorous well development, and, in some cases, jeopardizes the hydrochemistry. Complete removal of bentonite drilling fluids may not be possible due to the limited ability to vigorously develop engineered MLS systems.
- Temporary casing completion: the MLS is inserted down the inside of temporary drill casing or core rods extending to the bottom of the borehole and, the seals are emplaced from the bottom as the casing/core rod string is slowly retracted. Hence, the drill casing/core rods acts as the temporary protective shield during the installation. This type of installation is most common when the drilling is done by sonic methods in overburden or in unstable bedrock. Installations using rotary wireline coring tools and air-rotary casing hammer (ARCH) methods are also of this type.
- Multi-screen casing completion: the MLS is installed inside of a multi-screened steel or PVC well. Each well screen segment has a sand or gravel pack between it and the borehole wall, and is thus isolated from monitoring zones above and below by a grout or bentonite seal. The MLS is then constructed inside of the multi-screened well. This adds another step to the well installation process (i.e., first installing a multi-screened well), but has several advantages. First, installing conventional steel or PVC wells is straightforward and routine for most drilling contractors. Consequently, it is not necessary that the drilling contractor have expertise in installing multilevel monitoring systems. Once the multi-screened wells have been installed and developed, the drilling contractor's job is done, and the multilevel systems can often be installed by field technicians, often at a lower cost. Second, the various monitoring zones can be developed using standard well development equipment and procedures before the multilevel monitoring systems are installed in the wells. Finally, installing multilevel systems inside multi-screened wells may simplify the task of decommissioning the wells once they are no longer needed. Most of the multilevel systems can be constructed so that they can be easily removed from the multi-screened wells. Then, the multi-screened wells can be pressure-grouted or drilled out using standard well decommissioning procedures.

== Commercial MLS Technologies ==
=== Solinst CMT System ===
The Solinst continuous multichannel tubing (CMT) system is a system that uses custom-extruded flexible 1.7-inch OD multichannel MDPE tubing to monitor as many as seven discrete zones within a single borehole in either unconsolidated sedimentary or in bedrock. Prior to insertion, ports are created that allow groundwater to enter each of the six outer pie-shaped channels (nominal diameter=0.5 in) at different depths with a central hexagonal center channel (nominal diameter=0.4 in) at the bottom. The multichannel tubing can be extruded in lengths up to 300 feet and is generally shipped as 200 foot lengths in 4-ft-diameter coils. The desired length of tubing, equal to the total depth of the multilevel well plus stickup, is cut from the coil, and the well is built at the jobsite based on the hydrogeologic data obtained from the exploratory boring or other methods. The tubing is stiff enough to be easily handled, yet light and flexible enough to allow site workers to insert the multilevel well hand-over-hand into the borehole. To date, CMT installations have been almost entirely backfilled installations where the sand packs and bentonite seals are poured or tremied from the ground surface. Einarson and Cherry (2002) provide additional information on the CMT system. More information is also provided by Solinst.

=== Solinst Waterloo System ===
The Solinst Waterloo Multilevel groundwater monitoring system is a modular MLS designed to collect groundwater data from multiple depths within a single borehole via a series of monitoring ports positioned at specific intervals along 2-inch ID Schedule 80 PVC casing. The various monitoring ports can be connected to a combination of: sampling pumps, transducers, or polyethylene tubes that extend from the ports to the ground surface inside of the PVC casing. The smooth exterior wall of the PVC casing facilitates construction of annular seals between the monitored zones in the borehole via backfilling with alternating layers of sand and bentonite, or using expandable packers manufactured by Solinst. The sections of PVC casing have water-tight joints to prevent hydraulic cross-communication within the well. Depending on the diameter and number of monitoring equipment, the system can have up to 24 ports. The system is described in more detail by Einarson (2006), with additional information provided by Solinst.

=== Solinst Multilevel Drive-Point Piezometer ===
The Solinst Multilevel Drive-Point Piezometer can provide up to six monitoring zones in one drive location. Multilevel Drive-Point Piezometers consist of ports with stainless steel, 100 mesh cylindrical filter-screens in 3/4" OD stainless steel drive-point port bodies. The ports are connected using 3/4" NPT stainless couplings and 3/4" NPT steel drive pipe extensions. A Drive-Point Tip threads onto the first extension, or port, to be driven into the ground. The ports have a dual barbed stem that allows the connection of either 3/8" OD or 1/4" OD polyethylene or PTFE-lined tubing to create up to 3 or 6 monitoring zones, respectively. Monitoring ports, couplings, and extensions are added as the piezometer is advanced into the subsurface. Solinst Multilevel Drive-Point Piezometers can be driven into the ground with any direct push or drilling technology, including a Manual Slide Hammer. Multilevel Drive-point Piezometers are suitable for many sites; depth limitations vary with soil conditions and the drive method used. You can find more information on the Solinst website.

=== Water FLUTe System ===
The Water FLUTe system is a MLS that uses a flexible impermeable liner of polyurethane-coated nylon fabric inflated against the borehole wall to isolate many discrete intervals, each of which is accessed by a sampling tube that extends to the ground surface. The system is custom-made at the factory to the customer's specifications and then shipped on a reel to the site for installation. The system can be used to monitor a few zones in boreholes as small as 2-inches, to boreholes up to 20 inches in diameter where numerous depth intervals can be monitored (most installations are in the 4- to 10-inch diameter borehole range) with maximum depth to date of 1,400 feet. Depth-to-water measurements can be made inside the sampling tubing using small-diameter water-level meters. Optional dedicated pressure transducers facilitate continuous, long-term pressure monitoring. Water FLUTe systems are described further by Einarson (2006) and Cherry et al. (2007) and by accessing the FLUTe website.

=== Westbay MP System ===
The Westbay MP system is a modular instrumentation system for multilevel groundwater monitoring acquired by Nova Metrix in 2015, the MP system consists of two parts: (1) the casing system and (2) portable probes and tools that provide a compatible data acquisition system. The Westbay casing system is designed to allow the monitoring of multiple discrete levels in a single borehole. The casing comes in two different sizes, the MP38 system (38 mm, 1.5-inch) and MP55 system (55 mm, 2.25-inch).

One single string of water-tight Westbay casing sections is installed in the borehole. Each desired monitoring zone has valved couplings and ports to access groundwater outside the casing and instruments inside the casing. Westbay packers or backfilled seals are used to seal the borehole between monitoring zones to prevent the unnatural vertical flow of groundwater in the wellbore and maintain the in situ distribution of fluid pressures and chemistry. The Westbay system can be installed in either open rock boreholes or cased wells with multiple screens. Systems have also been installed in backfilled boreholes. Specialized equipment and probes lowered down the casing to each port are used to monitor and collect samples from Westbay systems. This system can incorporate a large number of monitoring intervals because the system is entirely modular and does not require multiple tubes extending to the ground surface. Westbay MLS systems have been installed to a maximum depth of 7,128 feet. Additional information about the system is presented by Black et al. (1986) and Einarson (2006). More information is also available on the website.

== Decommissioning ==
To decommission a MLS system in either open rock holes or in multi-screen casing, the MLS must either be removed to allow the hole to be grouted up, or the MLS must be designed such that, when left in place, it can be fully sealed by grouting (i.e. a "grouted-in-place" system). For backfilled installations, removal of the MLS can be difficult, so the MLS systems are typically grouted in place. Alternatively, the MLS must be drilled out or over-drilled for removal and then the over-drilled hole grouted up.

Installation of MLS systems in multi-screened cased wells simplifies the decommissioning process for all systems, which is one reason why such installations are becoming popular. Having a smooth, low-friction, consistent inside-diameter pipe surrounding the MLS system simplifies removal of the MLS components. The multi-screened well casing can then be decommissioned using standard methods such as pressure grouting or by drilling out the casing.

Specific guidance and protocol for decommissioning the various commercial MLS technologies is available from the system manufacturers.

== Applicability ==
=== Overburden and rock ===
All of the commercially available multilevel systems can be installed in unconsolidated overburden, typically using the backfill method. With the FLUTe system, however, the annular seals are created by the liner that is pressed against the borehole wall via pressure applied by water, air or sand that fills the liner.

All of the systems can be installed in bedrock. With the exception of FLUTe, annular seals can be installed via the backfill method. Expandable, inflatable packers are also available for the Solinst Waterloo and Westbay systems. Seals for FLUTe MLS systems are created by the FLUTe liner as discussed above. FLUTe systems have been primarily installed in bedrock coreholes, often as part of investigations that incorporate elements of the Discrete Fracture Network (DFN) approach.

=== Depth ranges ===
All of the engineered MLS technologies can be installed at shallow depths, but only the Westbay MLS system can be installed to depths up to several thousand feet. The Solinst CMT system is the most common shallow MLS system. There have been more than 5,000 installations of CMT systems worldwide to depths typically less than 200 feet with some installations to 500 feet using 3 Channel CMT. Solinst Waterloo systems are typically installed to depths up to 1000 feet. Water FLUTe and Westbay systems have been installed to depths greater than 1000 feet, although there have been more deep Westbay systems installed than FLUTe systems. The deepest engineered MLS system is a Westbay system with 11 monitoring ports that was installed to a depth of 7,128 feet in Illinois.

=== Contaminated site assessment and remediation ===
All of the MLS systems have strong applications in assessing contaminated sites. The MLS wells can be installed along sampling transects to provide economical, high-resolution insights into the contaminant distribution and flux rates. Identification of plume cores is very important for designing effective in situ remediation systems such as permeable reactive barriers (PRBs). Transects of MLS systems also provide robust data for performance monitoring of in situ remediation. MLS systems also provide information regarding vertical hydraulic gradients. Strong vertical gradients in a head profile can be used to identify aquitards that constitute strong barriers to vertical contaminant migration.

=== Geotechnical ===
Depth-dependent hydraulic head data is very important for geotechnical studies. Some of the earliest applications of vertical head profiles were in support of geotechnical studies of rock stability (e.g., Patton 1983).

=== Water resources ===
There is a strong need for depth-discrete head and water quality data in water resources studies and planning. Variations in heads with depth can identify effective aquitards that can impede recharge to deep aquifers. Vertical head profiles provide important calibration points for groundwater models. Depth-discrete groundwater quality data is also very useful for optimization of well construction and pumping programs to extract groundwater of acceptable quality. One of the biggest deployments of Westbay MLS systems was to support management of a multi-layer aquifer in Orange County, California. Westbay MLS well are also used to optimize groundwater quality and extract for a water district in the Mojave Desert of California.
