= Nonlimiting water range =

Range of water in soil where plant growth is least limited

The non-limiting water range (NLWR) represents the range of water content in the soil where limitations to plant growth (such as water potential, air-filled porosity, or soil strength) are minimal. John Letey (1985) from UC Riverside introduced the NLWR concept in an attempt to integrate several physical properties associated with plant or root growth to refine the concept of available water capacity. Alvaro Pires da Silva, Bev Kay, and Ed Perfect (University of Guelph, Ontario) (1994) refined the concept and termed it least limiting water range (LLWR).

The upper limit (wet end) of LLWR is determined not only by water content at field capacity (FC), but also the capability of providing adequate aeration for plant roots (usually taken as a minimum air filled porosity of 10%). The upper limit is then defined as:

min q {air filled porosity = 0.1, FC}.

Rather than air-filled porosity at 10%, LaoSheng Wu from UC Riverside proposed moisture content where Oxygen gas diffusion rate ODR value of 0.2 micro-g/cm2/min as criteria for satisfactory aeration status.

The lower limit (dry end) is not only limited to permanent wilting point (PWP) but also the ability of root penetration. This is measured as soil mechanical resistance taken at an arbitrary value, say penetration at 3 MPa. The lower limit is defined as:

max q {mechanical resistance = 3 MPa, PWP}.

== See also ==
- Integral energy
- Irrigation scheduling
- Limiting factor
- Moisture equivalent
- Moisture stress
- Pedotransfer function
- Soil plant atmosphere continuum
