= Integral energy =

Integral energy is the amount of energy required to remove water from soil with an initial water content $\theta_i$ to water content of $\theta_f$ (where $\theta_i > \theta_f$). It is calculated by integrating the water retention curve, soil water potential $\psi(\theta)$ with respect to $\theta$:

$E_i = \int_{\theta_i}^{\theta_f} \frac{1}{\theta_i-\theta_f} \psi(\theta)\, d\theta$

It is proposed by Minasny and McBratney (2003) as alternative to available water capacity. (AWC) The AWC concept assumes equal availability of water between two potentials and does not consider the path along the water retention curve. Integral energy takes into the account the path or energy (characterised by water retention curve) required to dry a soil at particular soil moisture content

== See also ==
- Available water capacity
- Nonlimiting water range
