= Pedotransfer function =

In soil science, pedotransfer functions (PTF) are predictive functions of certain soil properties using data from soil surveys.

The term pedotransfer function was coined by Johan Bouma as translating data we have into what we need. The most readily available data comes from a soil survey, such as the field morphology, soil texture, structure and pH. Pedotransfer functions add value to this basic information by translating them into estimates of other more laborious and expensively determined soil properties. These functions fill the gap between the available soil data and the properties which are more useful or required for a particular model or quality assessment. Pedotransfer functions utilize various regression analysis and data mining techniques to extract rules associating basic soil properties with more difficult to measure properties.

Although not formally recognized and named until 1989, the concept of the pedotransfer function has long been applied to estimate soil properties that are difficult to determine. Many soil science agencies have their own (unofficial) rule of thumb for estimating difficult-to-measure soil properties. Probably because of the particular difficulty, cost of measurement, and availability of large databases, the most comprehensive research in developing PTFs has been for the estimation of water retention curve and hydraulic conductivity.

== History ==
The first PTF came from the study of Lyman Briggs and McLane (1907). They determined the wilting coefficient, which is defined as percentage water content of a soil when the plants growing in that soil are first reduced to a wilted condition from which they cannot recover in an approximately saturated atmosphere without the addition of water to the soil, as a function of particle-size:

Wilting coefficient = 0.01 sand + 0.12 silt + 0.57 clay

With the introduction of the field capacity (FC) and permanent wilting point (PWP) concepts by Frank Veihmeyer and Arthur Hendricksen (1927), research during the period 1950-1980 attempted to correlate particle-size distribution, bulk density and organic matter content with water content at field capacity (FC), permanent wilting point (PWP), and available water capacity (AWC).

In the 1960s various papers dealt with the estimation of FC, PWP, and AWC, notably in a series of papers by Salter and Williams (1965 etc.). They explored relationships between texture classes and available water capacity, which are now known as class PTFs. They also developed functions relating the particle-size distribution to AWC, now known as continuous PTFs. They asserted that their functions could predict AWC to a mean accuracy of 16%.

In the 1970s more comprehensive research using large databases was developed. A particularly good example is the study by Hall et al. (1977) from soil in England and Wales; they established field capacity, permanent wilting point, available water content, and air capacity as a function of textural class, and as well as deriving continuous functions estimating these soil-water properties. In the USA, Gupta and Larson (1979) developed 12 functions relating particle-size distribution and organic matter content to water content at potentials ranging from -4 kPa to -1500 kPa.

With the flourishing development of models describing soil hydraulic properties and computer modelling of soil-water and solute transport, the need for hydraulic properties as inputs to these models became more evident. Clapp and Hornberger (1978) derived average values for the parameters of a power-function water retention curve, sorptivity and saturated hydraulic conductivity for different texture classes. In probably the first research of its kind, Bloemen (1977) derived empirical equations relating parameters of the Brooks and Corey hydraulic model to particle-size distribution.

Jurgen Lamp and Kneib (1981) from Germany introduced the term pedofunction, while Bouma and van Lanen (1986) used the term transfer function. To avoid confusion with the term transfer function used in soil physics and in many other disciplines, Johan Bouma (1989) later called it pedotransfer function. (A personal anecdote hinted that Arnold Bregt from Wageningen University suggested this term).

Since then, the development of hydraulic PTFs has become a boom research topic, first in the US and Europe, South America, Australia and all over the world.

Although most PTFs have been developed to predict soil hydraulic properties, they are not restricted to hydraulic properties. PTFs for estimating soil physical, mechanical, chemical and biological properties have also been developed.

== Software ==
There are several available programs that aid determining hydraulic properties of soils using pedotransfer functions, among them are

- SOILPAR – by Acutis and Donatelli
- ROSETTA – by Schaap et al. of the USDA, uses artificial neural networks

== Soil inference systems ==
McBratney et al. (2002) introduced the concept of a soil inference system, SINFERS, where pedotransfer functions are the knowledge rules for soil inference engines. A soil inference system takes measurements with a given level of certainty (source) and by means of logically linked pedotransfer functions (organiser) infers data that is not known with minimal inaccuracy (predictor).

== See also ==
- Moisture equivalent
- Nonlimiting water range
- Soil functions
