= Soil water =

Soil water can refer to:

- Soil#Soil moisture - water in soil
- Soil water (retention) - water-holding phenomenon inside soil
- Blackwater (waste) - wastewater related to effluent from water closets, toilets and urinals
