= Moisture equivalent =

Measure of field capacity

Moisture equivalent was proposed by Lyman Briggs and McLane (1910) as a measure of field capacity for fine-textured soil materials. Moisture equivalent is defined as the percentage of water which a soil can retain in opposition to a centrifugal force 1000 times that of gravity. It is measured by saturating a sample of soil 1 cm thick, and subjecting it to a centrifugal force of 1000 times gravity for 30 min. The gravimetric water content after this treatment is its moisture equivalent. This concept is no longer used in soil physics and has been replaced by field capacity.

Lyman Briggs and Homer LeRoy Shantz (1912) found that:

Moisture Equivalent = 0.02 sand + 0.22 silt + 1.05 clay

Note: The volume of water stored in the root zone is equal to the depth of water in the root zone (Vw=Dw)

== See also ==
- Available water capacity
- Field capacity
- Nonlimiting water range
- Pedotransfer function
- Permanent wilting point
