= Moisture stress =

Form of abiotic stress

Moisture stress is a form of abiotic stress that occurs when the moisture of plant tissues is reduced to suboptimal levels. Water stress occurs in response to atmospheric and soil water availability when the transpiration rate exceeds the rate of water uptake by the roots and cells lose turgor pressure. Moisture stress is described by two main metrics, water potential and water content.

Moisture stress has an effect on stomatal opening, mainly causing a closure in stomata as to reduce the amount of carbon dioxide assimilation. Closing of the stomata also slows the rate of transpiration, which limits water loss and helps to prevent the wilting effects of moisture stress. This closing can be triggered by the roots sensing dry soil and in response producing the hormone ABA which when transported up the xylem into the leaves will reduce stomatal conductance and wall extensibility of growing cells. This lowers the rates of transpiration, photosynthesis and leaf expansion. ABA also increases the loosening of growing root cell walls and in turn increases root growth in an effort to find water in the soil.

Phenotypic response of plants to long-term water stress was measured in corn and showed that plants respond to water stress with both an increase in root growth both laterally and vertically. In all Droughted conditions the corn showed decrease in plant height and yield due to the decrease in water availability.

Genes induced during water-stress conditions are thought to function not only in protecting cells from water deficit by the production of important metabolic proteins but also in the regulation of genes for signal transduction in the water-stress response. There are four pathways that have been described that show the plants genetic response to moisture stress; two are ABA dependent while two are ABA independent. They all affect gene expression that increases the plants water stress tolerance.

The effects of moisture stress on photosynthesis can depend as much on the velocity and degree of photosynthetic recovery, as it depends on the degree and velocity of photosynthesis decline during water depletion. Plants that are subjected to mild stress can recover in 1–2 days however, plants subjected to severe water stress will only recover 40-60% of its maximum photosynthetic rates the day after re watering and may never reach maximum photosynthetic rates. The recovery from moisture stress starts with an increase in water content in leaves reopening the stomata then the synthesis of photosynthetic proteins.

== See also ==
- Nonlimiting water range
- Permanent wilting point
- Soil plant atmosphere continuum
- Stomata
