= Soil moisture =

Water content of the soil

A historic surface soil moisture change in the Horn of Africa from August 2020 - December 2022

Soil moisture is the water content of the soil. It can be expressed in terms of volume or weight. Soil moisture measurement can be based on in situ probes (e.g., capacitance probes, neutron probes) or remote sensing methods.

Water that enters a field is removed from it by runoff, drainage, evaporation or transpiration. Runoff is the water that flows on the surface to the edge of the field; drainage is the water that flows through the soil downward or toward the edge of the field underground; evaporative water loss from a field is that part of the water that evaporates into the atmosphere directly from the field's surface; transpiration is the loss of water from the field by its evaporation from the plant itself.

Water affects soil formation, structure, stability and erosion but is of primary concern with respect to plant growth. Water is essential to plants for four reasons:

1. It constitutes 80–95% of the plant's protoplasm.
2. It is essential for photosynthesis.
3. It is the solvent in which nutrients are carried to, into and throughout the plant.
4. It provides the turgidity by which the plant keeps itself in proper position.

In addition, water alters the soil profile by dissolving and re-depositing mineral and organic solutes and colloids, often at lower levels, a process called leaching. In a loam soil, solids constitute half the volume, gas one-quarter of the volume, and water one-quarter of the volume of which only half will be available to most plants, with a strong variation according to matric potential.

Water moves in soil under the influence of gravity, osmosis and capillarity. When water enters the soil, it displaces air from interconnected macropores by buoyancy, and breaks aggregates into which air is entrapped, a process called slaking.

The rate at which a soil can absorb water depends on the soil and its other conditions. As a plant grows, its roots remove water from the largest pores (macropores) first. Soon the larger pores hold only air, and the remaining water is found only in the intermediate- and smallest-sized pores (micropores). The water in the smallest pores is so strongly held to particle surfaces that plant roots cannot pull it away. Consequently, not all soil water is available to plants, with a strong dependence on texture. When saturated, the soil may lose nutrients as the water drains. Water moves in a draining field under the influence of pressure where the soil is locally saturated and by capillarity pull to drier parts of the soil. Most plant water needs are supplied from the suction caused by evaporation from plant leaves (transpiration) and a lower fraction is supplied by suction created by osmotic pressure differences between the plant interior and the soil solution. Plant roots must seek out water and grow preferentially in moister soil microsites, but some parts of the root system are also able to remoisten dry parts of the soil. Insufficient water will damage the yield of a crop. Most of the available water is used in transpiration to pull nutrients into the plant.

Soil water is also important for climate modeling and numerical weather prediction. The Global Climate Observing System specified soil water as one of the 50 Essential Climate Variables (ECVs). Soil water can be measured in situ with soil moisture sensors or can be estimated at various scales and resolution: from local or wifi measures via sensors in the soil to satellite imagery that combines data capture and hydrological models. Each method exhibits pros and cons, and hence, the integration of different techniques may decrease the drawbacks of a single given method.

== Moisture level concepts ==
A soil-air matrix exhibiting gravitational, capillary and hygroscopic water.

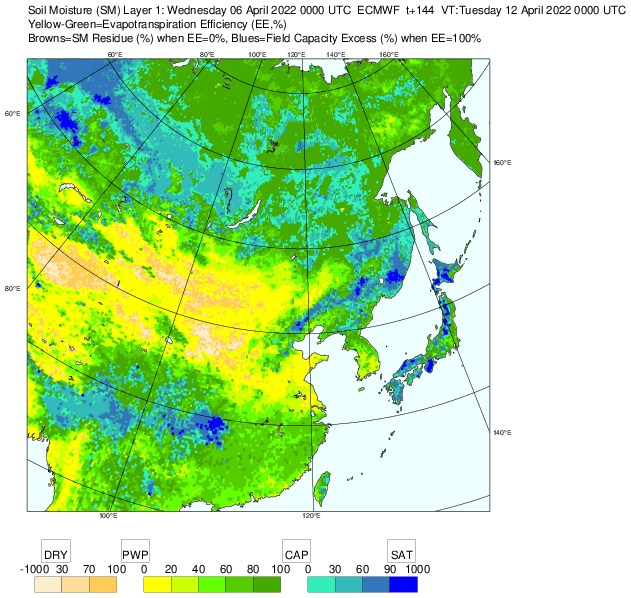
ECMWF soil moisture forecast for the East Asia region, showing the key moisture levels and intermediate measurements

Field capacity
A flooded field will drain the gravitational water under the influence of gravity until water's adhesive and cohesive forces resist further drainage at which point it is said to have reached field capacity. At that point, plants must apply suction to draw water from a soil. By convention it is defined at 0.33 bar suction.
Available water and unavailable water
The water that plants may draw from the soil is called the available water. Once the available water is used up the remaining moisture is called unavailable water as the plant cannot produce sufficient suction to draw that water in.
Wilting point
The wilting point is the minimum amount of water plants need to not wilt and approximates the boundary between available and unavailable water. By convention it is defined as 15 bar suction. At this point, seeds will not germinate, plants begin to wilt and then die unless they are able to recover after water replenishment thanks to species-specific adaptations.

== Water retention ==
Water is retained in a soil when the adhesive force of attraction that water's hydrogen atoms have for the oxygen of soil particles is stronger than the cohesive forces that water's hydrogen feels for water oxygen atoms. When a field is flooded, the soil pore space is completely filled by water. The field will drain under the force of gravity until it reaches what is called field capacity, at which point the smallest pores are filled with water and the largest with water and gases. The total amount of water held when field capacity is reached is a function of the specific surface area of the soil particles. As a result, high clay and high organic soils have higher field capacities. The potential energy of water per unit volume relative to pure water in reference conditions is called water potential. Total water potential is a sum of matric potential which results from capillary action, osmotic potential for saline soil, and gravitational potential when dealing with downward water movement. Water potential in soil usually has negative values, and therefore it is also expressed in suction, which is defined as the minus of water potential. Suction has a positive value and can be regarded as the total force required to pull or push water out of soil. Water potential or suction is expressed in units of kPa (10^{3} pascal), bar (100 kPa), or cm H_{2}O (approximately 0.098 kPa). Common logarithm of suction in cm H_{2}O is called pF. Therefore, pF 3 = 1000 cm = 98 kPa = 0.98 bar.

The forces with which water is held in soils determine its availability to plants. Forces of adhesion hold water strongly to mineral and humus surfaces and less strongly to itself by cohesive forces. A plant's root may penetrate a very small volume of water that is adhering to soil and be initially able to draw in water that is only lightly held by the cohesive forces. But as the droplet is drawn down, the forces of adhesion of the water for the soil particles produce increasingly higher suction, finally up to 1500 kPa (pF = 4.2). At 1500 kPa suction, the soil water amount is called wilting point. At that suction the plant cannot sustain its water needs as water is still being lost from the plant by transpiration, the plant's turgidity is lost, and it wilts, although stomatal closure may decrease transpiration and thus may retard wilting below the wilting point, in particular under adaptation or acclimatization to drought. The next level, called air-dry, occurs at 100,000 kPa suction (pF = 6). Finally the oven dry condition is reached at 1,000,000 kPa suction (pF = 7). All water below wilting point is called unavailable water.

When the soil moisture content is optimal for plant growth, the water in the large (macropores) and intermediate (mesopores) size pores can move about in the soil and be easily used by plants. The amount of water remaining in a soil drained to field capacity and the amount that is available are functions of the soil texture. Sandy soil will retain very little water, while clay will hold the maximum amount. The available water for the silt loam might be 20% whereas for the sand it might be only 6% by volume, as shown in this table.

Wilting point, field capacity, and available water of various soil textures (unit: % by volume)
Soil Texture	Wilting Point	Field Capacity	Available water
Sand	3.3	9.1	5.8
Sandy loam	9.5	20.7	11.2
Loam	11.7	27.0	15.3
Silt loam	13.3	33.0	19.7
Clay loam	19.7	31.8	12.1
Clay	27.2	39.6	12.4

The above are average values for the soil textures.

== Water flow ==
Water moves through soil due to the forces of gravity, osmosis and capillarity. At 0 to 33 kPa suction (field capacity), water is pushed through soil from the point of its application under the force of gravity and the pressure gradient created by differences in the pressure of water; this is called saturated flow. At higher suction, water movement is pulled by capillarity from wetter toward drier soil. This is caused by water's adhesion to soil solids, and is called unsaturated flow.

Water infiltration and movement in soil are controlled by six factors:

1. Soil texture
2. Soil structure. Fine-textured soils with granular structure are most favourable to infiltration of water.
3. The amount of organic matter. Coarse matter is best and if on the surface helps prevent the destruction of soil structure and the creation of soil crusts.
4. Depth of soil to impervious layers such as hardpans or bedrock
5. The amount of water already in the soil
6. Soil temperature. Warm soils take in water faster while frozen soils such as permafrost may not be able to absorb depending on the type of freezing.

Water infiltration rates range from 0.25 cm per hour for high clay soils to 2.5 cm per hour for sand and well stabilized and aggregated soil structures. Water flows through the ground unevenly, in the form of so-called gravity fingers, because of the surface tension between water particles.

Tree roots, whether living or dead, create preferential channels for rainwater flow through soil, magnifying infiltration rates of water up to 27 times.

Flooding temporarily increases soil permeability in river beds, helping to recharge aquifers.

Water applied to a soil is pushed by pressure gradients from the point of its application where it is saturated locally, to less saturated areas, such as the vadose zone. Once soil is completely wetted, any more water will move downward (leaching), or percolate out of the range of plant roots, carrying with it clay, humus, nutrients, primarily cations, and various contaminants, including pesticides, pollutants, viruses and bacteria, potentially causing groundwater contamination. In order of decreasing solubility, the leached nutrients are:

- Calcium
- Magnesium, Sulfur, Potassium; depending upon soil composition
- Nitrogen; usually little, unless nitrate fertiliser was applied recently
- Phosphorus; very little as its forms in soil are of low solubility.

Water that drains through the soil at macropores when it rains is called gravitational water.

In the United States percolation water due to rainfall ranges from almost zero centimeters just east of the Rocky Mountains to fifty or more centimeters per day in the Appalachian Mountains and the north coast of the Gulf of Mexico.

Water is pulled by capillary action due to the adhesion force of water to the soil solids, producing a suction gradient from wet towards drier soil and from macropores to micropores. The so-called Richards equation allows calculation of the time rate of change of moisture content in soils due to the movement of water in unsaturated soils. Interestingly, this equation attributed to Lorenzo Richards was originally published by Lewis Richardson in 1922. The soil moisture velocity equation, which can be solved using the finite water-content vadose zone flow method, describes the velocity of flowing water through an unsaturated soil in the vertical direction. The numerical solution of the Richardson/Richards equation allows calculation of unsaturated water flow and solute transport using software such as Hydrus, by giving soil hydraulic parameters of hydraulic functions (water retention function and unsaturated hydraulic conductivity function) and initial and boundary conditions. Preferential flow occurs along interconnected macropores, crevices, root and worm channels, which drain water under gravity.

Many models based on soil physics now allow for some representation of preferential flow as a dual continuum, dual porosity or dual permeability options, but these have generally been "bolted on" to the Richards solution without any rigorous physical underpinning.

== Water uptake by plants ==
Of equal importance to the storage and movement of water in soil is the means by which plants acquire it and their nutrients. Most soil water is taken up by plants as passive absorption caused by the pulling force of water evaporating (transpiring) from the long column of water (xylem sap flow) that leads from the plant's roots to its leaves, according to the cohesion-tension theory. The upward movement of water and solutes (hydraulic lift) is regulated in the roots by the endodermis and in the plant foliage by stomatal conductance, and can be interrupted in root and shoot xylem vessels by cavitation, also called xylem embolism. In addition, the high concentration of salts within plant roots creates an osmotic pressure gradient that pushes soil water into the roots. Osmotic absorption becomes more important during times of low water transpiration caused by lower temperatures (for example at night) or high humidity, and the reverse occurs under high temperature or low humidity. It is these processes that cause guttation and wilting, respectively.

Root extension is vital for plant survival. A study of a single winter rye plant grown for four months in one cubic foot (0.0283 cubic meters) of loam soil showed that the plant developed 13,800,000 roots, a total of 620 km in length with 237 square meters in surface area; and 14 billion root hairs of 10,620 km total length and 400 square meters total area; for a total surface area of 638 square meters. The total surface area of the loam soil was estimated to be 52,000 square meters. In other words, the roots were in contact with only 1.2% of the soil volume. However, root extension should be viewed as a dynamic process, allowing new roots to explore a new volume of soil each day, increasing dramatically the total volume of soil explored over a given growth period, and thus the volume of water taken up by the root system over this period. Root architecture, i.e. the spatial configuration of the root system, plays a prominent role in the adaptation of plants to soil water and nutrient availability, and thus in plant productivity.

Roots must seek out water as the unsaturated flow of water in soil can move only at a rate of up to 2.5 cm per day; as a result they are constantly dying and growing as they seek out high concentrations of soil moisture. Insufficient soil moisture, to the point of causing wilting, will cause permanent damage and crop yields will suffer. When grain sorghum was exposed to soil suction as low as 1300 kPa during the seed head emergence through bloom and seed set stages of growth, its production was reduced by 34%.

== Consumptive use and water use efficiency ==
Only a small fraction (0.1% to 1%) of the water used by a plant is held within the plant. The majority is ultimately lost via transpiration. At the same time evaporation from the soil surface is also substantial, the transpiration:evaporation ratio (T/ET) varying according to vegetation type and climate, peaking in tropical rainforests and dipping in steppes and deserts. Transpiration plus evaporative soil moisture loss is called evapotranspiration. Evapotranspiration plus water held in the plant totals to consumptive use, which is nearly identical to evapotranspiration.

The total water used in an agricultural field includes surface runoff, drainage and consumptive use. The use of loose mulches will reduce evaporative losses for a period after a field is irrigated, but in the end, the total evaporative loss (plant plus soil) will approach that of uncovered soil, while more water is immediately available for plant growth. Water use efficiency is measured by the transpiration ratio, which is the ratio of the total water transpired by a plant to the dry weight of the harvested plant. Transpiration ratios for crops range from 300 to 700. For example, alfalfa may have a transpiration ratio of 500; as a result, 500 kilograms of water will produce one kilogram of dry alfalfa.

== Bibliography ==
- Donahue, Roy Luther; Miller, Raymond W.; Shickluna, John C. (1977). Soils: An Introduction to Soils and Plant Growth. Prentice-Hall. ISBN 978-0-13-821918-5.
- Arizona Master Gardener. Cooperative Extension, College of Agriculture, University of Arizona. May 2019.
- Stefferud, Alfred, ed. (1957). Soil: The Yearbook of Agriculture 1957. United States Department of Agriculture. OCLC 704186906.
  - Richards & Richards. "Soil Moisture". In Stefferud (1957).
  - Wadleigh. "Growth of Plants". In Stefferud (1957).
