= Hydraulic redistribution =

Biological phenomenon

Hydraulic redistribution is a passive mechanism where water is transported from moist to dry soils via subterranean networks. It occurs in vascular plants that commonly have roots in both wet and dry soils, especially plants with both taproots that grow vertically down to the water table, and lateral roots that sit close to the surface. In the late 1980s, there was a movement to understand the full extent of these subterranean networks. Since then it was found that vascular plants are assisted by fungal networks which grow on the root system to promote water redistribution.

== Process ==
Hot, dry periods, when the surface soil dries out to the extent that the lateral roots exude whatever water they contain, will result in the death of such lateral roots unless the water is replaced. Similarly, under extremely wet conditions when lateral roots are inundated by flood waters, oxygen deprivation will also lead to root peril. In plants that exhibit hydraulic redistribution, there are xylem pathways from the taproots to the laterals, such that the absence or abundance of water at the laterals creates a pressure potential analogous to that of transpirational pull. In drought conditions, ground water is drawn up through the taproot to the laterals and exuded into the surface soil, replenishing that which was lost. Under flooding conditions, plant roots perform a similar function in the opposite direction.

Though often referred to as hydraulic lift, movement of water by the plant roots has been shown to occur in any direction. This phenomenon has been documented in over sixty plant species spanning a variety of plant types (from herbs and grasses to shrubs and trees) and over a range of environmental conditions (from the Kalahari Desert to the Amazon Rainforest).

== Causes ==
The movement of this water can be explained by a water transport theory throughout a plant. This well-established water transport theory is called the cohesion-tension theory. In brief, it explains the movement of water throughout the plant depends on having a continuous column of water, from the leaves to roots. Water is then pulled up from the roots to the leaves moving throughout the plant's vascular system, all facilitated by the differences in water potential in the boundary layers of the soil and the atmosphere. Therefore, the driving force for moving water through a plant is the cohesive strength of water molecules and a pressure gradient from the roots to the leaves. This theory is still applied when the boundary layer to the atmosphere is closed, e.g. when plant stomata are closed or in senesced plants. The pressure gradient is developed between soil layers with different water potentials causing water to move by the roots from wetter to drier soil layers in a similar manner as when a plant is transpiring.

== Fungal associations ==
It has been understood that hydraulic lift aids the host plant and its neighboring plants in the transportation of water and other vital nutrients. At that time, the hydraulic lift was described as the movement of water and soil nutrients from a vascularized host into the soil at night mostly. Then after studies in the 2000s, a more comprehensive word was taken into consideration where it described a bi-directional and passive movement exhibited by the plant roots and further assisted by mycorrhizal networks. A 2015 study then described a "direct transfer of hydraulically redistributed water" between the host and fungi into the surrounding root system. As mentioned, hydraulic redistribution not only transports water but nutrients as well. The fungi most likely to form water and nutrient networks are Ectomycorrhizae and Arbuscular mycorrhizae.

== Significance ==
The ecological importance of hydraulically redistributed water is becoming better understood as this phenomenon is more carefully examined. Water redistribution by plant roots has been found influencing crop irrigation, where watering schemes leave a harsh heterogeneity in soil moisture. This influencing process also assist in seedling success. The plant roots have been shown to smooth or homogenize the soil moisture. This sort of smoothing out of soil moisture is important in maintaining plant root health. The redistribution of water from deep moist layers to shallow drier layers by large trees has shown to increase the moisture available in the daytime to meet the transpiration demand.

The implications of hydraulic redistribution seem to have an important influence on plant ecosystems. Whether or not plants redistribute water through the soil layers can affect plant population dynamics, such as the facilitation of neighboring species. The increase in available daytime soil moisture can also offset low transpiration rates due to drought (see also drought rhizogenesis) or alleviate competition for water between competing plant species. Water redistributed to the near surface layers may also influence plant nutrient availability.

== Observations and modeling ==
Due to the ecological significance of hydraulically redistributed water, there is an ongoing effort to continue the categorization of plants exhibiting this behaviour and adapting this physiological process into land-surface models to improve model predictions.

Traditional methods of observating hydraulic redistribution include Deuterium isotope traces, sap flow, and soil moisture. In attempts to characterize the magnitude of the water redistributed, numerous models (both empirically and theoretically based) have been developed.

== See also ==
- Cohesion tension theory
- Evapotranspiration
- Mycorrhizal network
- Soil plant atmosphere continuum
- Water potential
