= Hydraulic lift =

Hydraulic lift may refer to:

- A type of hydraulic machinery
  - Hydraulic elevator
- A form of hydraulic redistribution, a plant phenomenon
