= Tensiometer =

Tensiometer may refer to one of a number of devices. The two most common are:

- Tensiometer (surface tension) an instrument used to measure the surface tension of liquids
- Tensiometer (soil science) an instrument to determine matric water potential
