= Lorenzo A. Richards =

American physicist

Lorenzo Adolph Richards (April 24, 1904 – March 12, 1993) or known as Ren was one of the 20th century's most influential minds in the field of soil physics.

== Biography ==
=== Early life ===
Lorenzo A. Richards was born on April 24, 1904, in the town of Fielding, Utah, and received a B.S. and M.A. degree in physics from Utah State University. He was the grandson of early Mormon leader and pioneer Willard Richards. His PhD thesis, completed at Cornell University in 1931 and entitled Capillary conduction of liquids through porous mediums, was arguably one of the best known in the field of soil physics.

=== Career ===
Following his time at Cornell, and a brief stint at Iowa State University, he spent the most part of his working life engaged in soil physics research at the United States Department of Agriculture Salinity Laboratory in Riverside, California.

==== Research ====
His thesis represented the first decisive progress beyond the work of Edgar Buckingham in the extension of Darcy's law to describe water movement in unsaturated soils. In this research, Richards described a partial differential equation, now commonly known by as the Richards equation.

One of his key interests was the energy status of soil water, and he led the way in developing new and improved methods of measuring soil water potential. Early in his career, Richards recognised the importance of capillary potential to plant-soil relations, and described the principles, construction and operation of the tensiometer. Richards also proposed the tension plate apparatus for determining capillary potential in soil. The tensiometer was developed from the idea of using a semi-permeable, porous ceramic material to balance a pressure potential against a matric potential; once equilibrium had established, the matric potential of the soil could be determined by balancing the pressure potential.

He made continual improvements to his original design and the operation of the tensiometer. The problem of measuring capillary potential beyond the range of the tensiometer was a further research interest of Richards. In 1941 he published a paper describing the pressure-membrane apparatus. Although Richards claimed the primary purpose of the apparatus was the extraction of soil solution for salinity analysis, he also pointed out its potential for application to energy studies.

==== Other work ====
Another important element of his work was in the field of soil-water-plant relations, and led to the standardisation of characteristic soil-water properties. Together with scientists at the USDA Salinity Laboratory in Riverside, Richards correlated water content at certain water potential values with then current soil water parameters. The currently accepted moisture potential values defining the lower and upper limits for plant growth; at field capacity (−1/3 bar, or −33 J/kg) and permanent wilting point (−15 bar, or −1500 J/kg) were determined through experimental work by Richards and his colleagues.

Over forty working years, he contributed much to knowledge of the energy status and transport of water in soil. He developed much of the modern apparatus and methodology used for study of soil water, hence playing a pivotal role in the transformation of knowledge on this subject from the qualitative stage to one based on measurements and mathematics.
