= Soil water (retention) =

Hydrological property of soil

Soils can process and hold considerable amounts of water. They can take in water, and will keep doing so until they are full, or until the rate at which they can transmit water into and through the pores is exceeded. Some of this water will steadily drain through the soil (via gravity) and end up in the waterways and streams, but much of it will be retained, despite the influence of gravity. Much of this retained water can be used by plants and other organisms, also contributing to land productivity and soil health.

== Soil water retention capacity ==
Pores (the spaces that exist between soil particles) provide for the passage and/or retention of gasses and moisture within the soil profile. The soil's ability to retain water is strongly related to particle size; water molecules hold more tightly to the fine particles of a clay soil than to coarser particles of a sandy soil, so clays generally retain more water. Conversely, sands provide easier passage or transmission of water through the profile. Clay type, organic content, and soil structure also influence soil water retention.

The maximum amount of water that a given soil can retain is called field capacity, whereas a soil so dry that plants cannot liberate the remaining moisture from the soil particles is said to be at wilting point. Available water is that which the plants can utilize from the soil within the range between field capacity and wilting point. Roughly speaking for agriculture (top layer soil), soil is 25% water, 25% air, 45% mineral, 5% other; water varies widely from about 1% to 90% due to several retention and drainage properties of a given soil.

The role of soil water retention is profound; its effects are far reaching and relationships are invariably complex. This section focuses on a few key roles and recognizes that it is beyond the scope of this discussion to encompass all roles that can be found in the literature.

The process by which soil absorbs water and water drains downwards is called percolation.

=== Soil water retention and organism ===
Soil water retention is essential to life. It provides an ongoing supply of water to plants between periods of replenishment (infiltration), so as to allow their continued growth and survival. For example, over much of temperate Victoria, Australia, this effect is seasonal and even inter-annual; the retained soil water that has accumulated in preceding wet winters permits the survival of most perennial plants over typically dry summers when monthly evaporation exceeds rainfall. Soils generally contain more nutrients, moisture, and humus.

=== Soil water retention and climate ===
Soil moisture has an effect on the thermal properties of a soil profile, including conductance and heat capacity. The association of soil moisture and soil thermal properties has a significant effect on temperature-related biological triggers, including seed germination, flowering, and faunal activity. (more water causes soil to more slowly gain or lose temperature given equal heating; water has roughly double the heat capacity of soil)

Recent climate modelling by Timbal et al. (2002) suggests a strong linkage between soil moisture and the persistence and variability of surface temperature and precipitation; further, that soil moisture is a significant consideration for the accuracy of "inter-annular" predications regarding the Australian climate.

=== Soil water retention, water balance, and other influences ===
The role of soil in retaining water is significant in terms of the hydrological cycle; including the relative ability of soil to hold moisture and changes in soil moisture over time:

- Soil water that is not retained or used by plants may continue downward through the profile and contribute to the water table (the permanently saturated zone at the base of the profile); this is termed "recharge". Soil that is at field capacity (among other reasons) may preclude infiltration so to increase overland flow. Both effects are associated with ground and surface water supplies, erosion, and salinity. Plant available water in sandy soils can be increased by the presence of sepiolite clay
- Soil water can affect the structural integrity or coherence of a soil; saturated soils can become unstable and result in structural failure and mass movement. Soil water, its changes over time and management are of interest to geo-technicians and soil conservationists with an interest in maintaining soil stability.

== See also ==
- Water content
- Water retention curve
