= Soil-plant-atmosphere continuum =

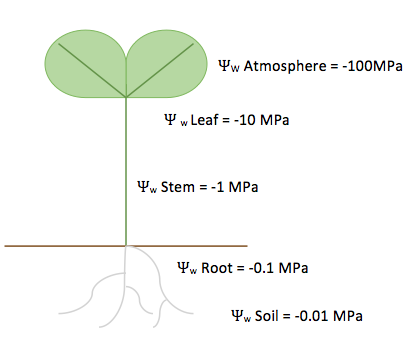
Arbitrary numbers picked to represent decreasing water potentials from the soil, through the plant, to the atmosphere. This shows the net movement of water down its potential energy gradient, from highest water potential in the soil to lowest water potential in the air.

The soil-plant-atmosphere continuum (SPAC) is the pathway for water moving from soil through plants to the atmosphere. Continuum in the description highlights the continuous nature of water connection through the pathway. The low water potential of the atmosphere, and relatively higher (i.e. less negative) water potential inside leaves, leads to a diffusion gradient across the stomatal pores of leaves, drawing water out of the leaves as vapour. As water vapour transpires out of the leaf, further water molecules evaporate off the surface of mesophyll cells to replace the lost molecules since water in the air inside leaves is maintained at saturation vapour pressure. Water lost at the surface of cells is replaced by water from the xylem, which due to the cohesion-tension properties of water in the xylem of plants pulls additional water molecules through the xylem from the roots toward the leaf.

== Components ==
The transport of water along this pathway occurs in components, variously defined among scientific disciplines:

- Soil physics characterizes water in soil in terms of tension,
- Physiology of plants and animals characterizes water in organisms in terms of diffusion pressure deficit, and
- Meteorology uses vapour pressure or relative humidity to characterize atmospheric water.

SPAC integrates these components and is defined as a:

...concept recognising that the field with all its components (soil, plant, animals and the ambient atmosphere taken together) constitutes a physically integrated, dynamic system in which the various flow processes involving energy and matter occur simultaneously and interdependently like links in the chain.

This characterises the state of water in different components of the SPAC as expressions of the energy level or water potential of each. Modelling of water transport between components relies on SPAC, as do studies of water potential gradients between segments.

== See also ==
- Ecohydrology
- Evapotranspiration
- Hydraulic redistribution; a parameter now being considered in the soil-plant-atmosphere modeling community
- Transpiration stream
