= Amplitude domain reflectometry =

Soil moisture measurement method through quantifiable electrical currents

Many soil moisture measuring instruments are based on the principle of Amplitude Domain Reflectometry (ADR). This method measures the electrical impedance. Electromagnetic waves traveling along Transmission Lines (TL) enter in soil medium whose impedance is different from TL a part of the energy is reflected back to transmitter. The reflected wave interferes with incident wave and produces a standing wave along the TL, this changes the amplitude of wave along the TL. The impedance can be measured from difference in amplitude. The impedance has two components: electrical conductivity and dielectric constant. The effect of conductivity can be minimized by selecting an appropriate frequency.
