= Drought rhizogenesis =

Plant root response to a lack of water

Drought rhizogenesis is an adaptive root response to drought stress. New emerging roots are short, swollen, and hairless, capable of retaining turgor pressure and resistant to prolonged desiccation. Upon rewatering, they are capable of quickly forming an absorbing root surface and hair growth. This rhizogenesis has been called a drought tolerance strategy for after-stress recovery.

== Structural features ==
These drought induced short roots can be found on either both the tap root and lateral roots or on lateral roots only. These patterns are mostly likely a reflection of the plants' individual ability to maintain meristematic activity under low water potential.

This morphological phenomenon was found in some families of Angiosperm dicot perennials and has been documented in Arabidopsis thaliana.
