= Permanent wilting point =

Soil moisture below which a plant will wilt

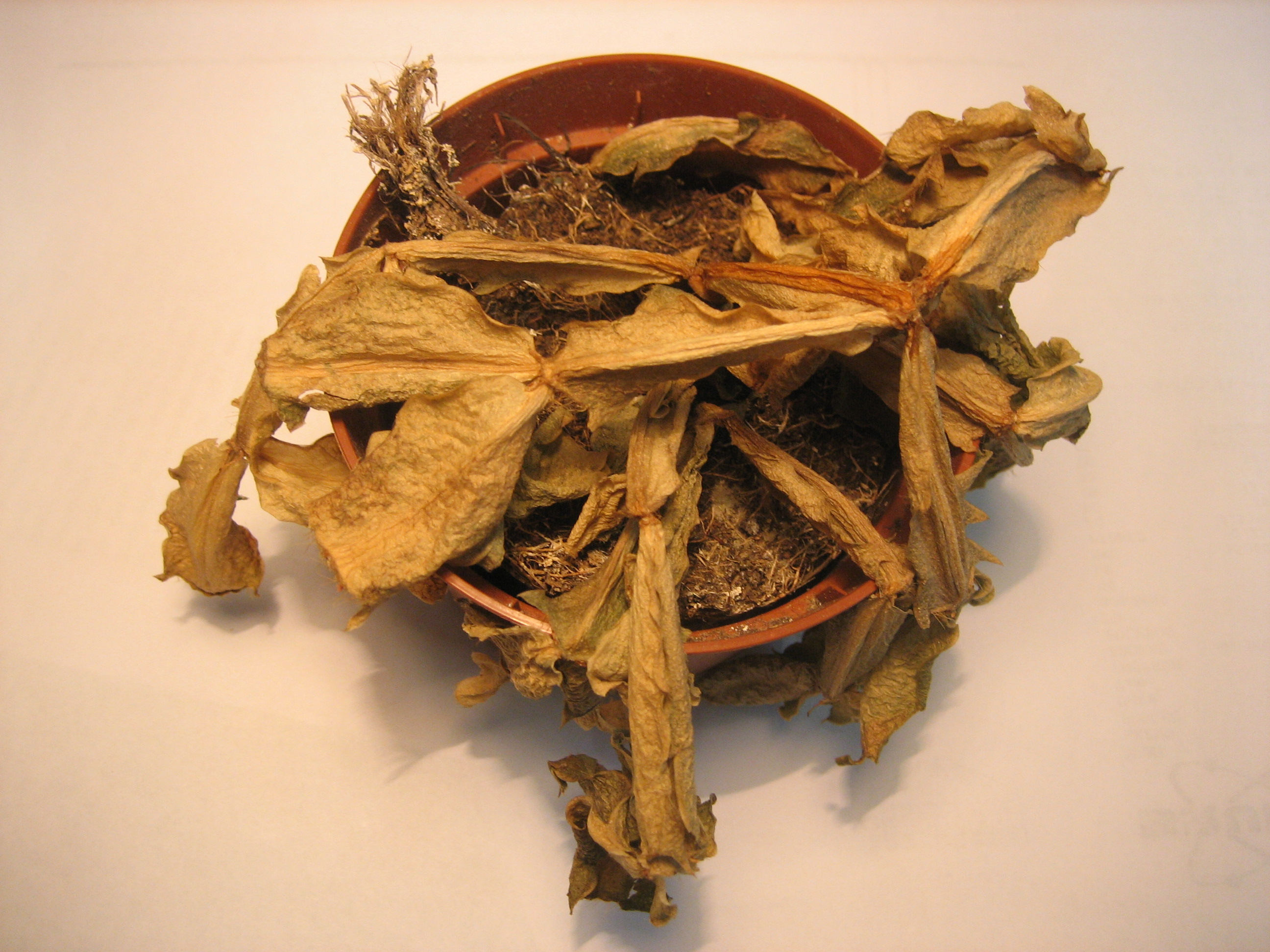
A plant rooted in soil that is beyond the wilting point.

Permanent wilting point (PWP) or wilting point (WP) is defined as the minimum amount of water in the soil that the plant requires not to wilt. If the soil water content decreases to this or any lower point a plant wilts and can no longer recover its turgidity when placed in a saturated atmosphere for 12 hours. The physical definition of the wilting point, symbolically expressed as θ_{pwp} or θ_{wp}, is said by convention as the water content at −1,500 kPa (−15 bar) of suction pressure, or negative hydraulic head.

== History ==
The concept was introduced in the early 1910s. Lyman Briggs and Homer LeRoy Shantz (1912) proposed the wilting coefficient, which is defined as the percentage water content of a soil when the plants growing in that soil are first reduced to a wilted condition from which they cannot recover in approximately saturated atmosphere without the addition of water to the soil. See pedotransfer function for wilting coefficient by Briggs.

Frank Veihmeyer and Arthur Hendrickson from University of California-Davis found that it is a constant (characteristic) of the soil and is independent of environmental conditions. Lorenzo A. Richards proposed it is taken as the soil water content when the soil is under a pressure of −15 bar.

== See also ==
- Available water capacity
- Ecohydrology
- Field capacity
- Moisture equivalent
- Moisture stress
- Nonlimiting water range
- Soil plant atmosphere continuum
- Water retention curve
