= Water retention curve =

Relationship between water and soil

Water retention curve for a sand (Ss), either silt or clay-loam (Uu), either loam-silt or clay (Lu), and either clay or peat (Tt).

Water retention curve is the relationship between the water content, θ, and the soil water potential, ψ. The soil moisture curve is characteristic for different soil types, and is also called the soil moisture characteristic.

It is used to predict soil water storage, plant water supply (field capacity) and soil aggregate stability. Due to the hysteretic effect of water filling and draining the pores, different wetting and drying curves may be distinguished.

The general features of a water retention curve can be seen in the figure, in which the volume water content, θ, is plotted against the matric potential, $\Psi_m$. At potentials close to zero, the soil is close to saturation, and water is held in the soil primarily by capillary forces. As θ decreases, binding of the water becomes stronger, and at small potentials (more negative, approaching wilting point) water is strongly bound in the smallest of pores, at contact points between grains and as films bound by adsorptive forces around particles.

Sandy soils will involve mainly capillary binding, and will therefore release most of the water at higher potentials, while clayey soils, with adhesive and osmotic binding, will release water at lower (more negative) potentials. At any given potential, peaty soils will usually display much higher moisture contents than clayey soils, which would be expected to hold more water than sandy soils. The water holding capacity of any soil is due to the porosity and the nature of the bonding in the soil.

== Curve models ==
The shape of water retention curves can be characterized by several models, one of them known as the van Genuchten model:

$$\theta(\psi) = \theta_r + \frac{\theta_s - \theta_r}{\left[ 1+(\alpha |\psi|)^n \right]^{1-1/n}}$$

where

$\theta(\psi)$ is the water retention curve [L^{3}L^{−3}];
$|\psi|$ is suction pressure ([L] or cm of water);
$\theta_s$ saturated water content [L^{3}L^{−3}];
$\theta_r$ residual water content [L^{3}L^{−3}];
$\alpha$ is related to the inverse of the air entry suction, $\alpha >0$ ([L^{−1}], or cm^{−1}); and,
$n$ is a measure of the pore-size distribution, $n>1$ (dimensionless).

Based on this parametrization a prediction model for the shape of the unsaturated hydraulic conductivity - saturation - pressure relationship was developed.

Several alternative retention models have been developed to account for different condition, including Brooks-Corey, Broadbridge-White, and Rogers-Stallybrass-Clements model.

== History ==
In 1907, Edgar Buckingham created the first water retention curve. It was measured and made for six soils varying in texture from sand to clay. The data came from experiments made on soil columns 48 inch tall, where a constant water level maintained about 2 inches above the bottom through periodic addition of water from a side tube. The upper ends were closed to prevent evaporation.

== Method ==
The Van Genuchten parameters ($\alpha$ and $n$) can be determined through field or laboratory testing. One of the methods is the instantaneous profile method, where water content $\theta$ (or effective saturation $Se$) are determined for a series of suction pressure measurements $\psi$. Due to the non-linearity of the equation, numerical techniques such as the non-linear least-squares method can be used to solve the van Genuchten parameters. The accuracy of the estimated parameters will depend on the quality of the acquired dataset ($\theta$ and $\psi$). Structural overestimation or underestimation can occur when water retention curves are fitted with non-linear least squares. In these cases, the representation of water retention curves can be improved in terms of accuracy and uncertainty by applying Gaussian Process regression to the residuals obtained after non-linear least-squares. This is mostly due to the correlation between the data points, which is accounted for with Gaussian Process regression through the kernel function.

== See also ==
- Soil water (retention)
