= Available water capacity =

Available water capacity is the amount of water that can be stored in a soil profile and be available for growing crops. It is also known as available water content (AWC), profile available water (PAW) or total available water (TAW).

== Concept ==
The concept, put forward by Frank Veihmeyer and Arthur Hendrickson, assumed that the water readily available to plants is the difference between the soil water content at field capacity (θ_{fc}) and permanent wilting point (θ_{pwp}):

θ_{a} ≡ θ_{fc} − θ_{pwp}

== Critisism ==
Daniel Hillel criticised that the terms FC and PWP were never clearly defined, and lack physical basis, and that soil water is never equally available within this range. He further suggested that a useful concept should concurrently consider the properties of plant, soil and meteorological conditions.

Lorenzo A. Richards remarked that the concept of availability is oversimplified. He viewed that: the term availability involves two notions: (a) the ability of plant root to absorb and use the water with which it is in contact and (b) the readiness or velocity with which the soil water moves in to replace that which has been used by the plant.

Plant available water in sandy soils can be increased by the presence of sepiolite clay.

== See also ==
- Field capacity
- Integral energy
- Nonlimiting water range
- Permanent wilting point
