= Homer L. Shantz =

American botanist and academic (1876–1958)

Homer LeRoy Shantz
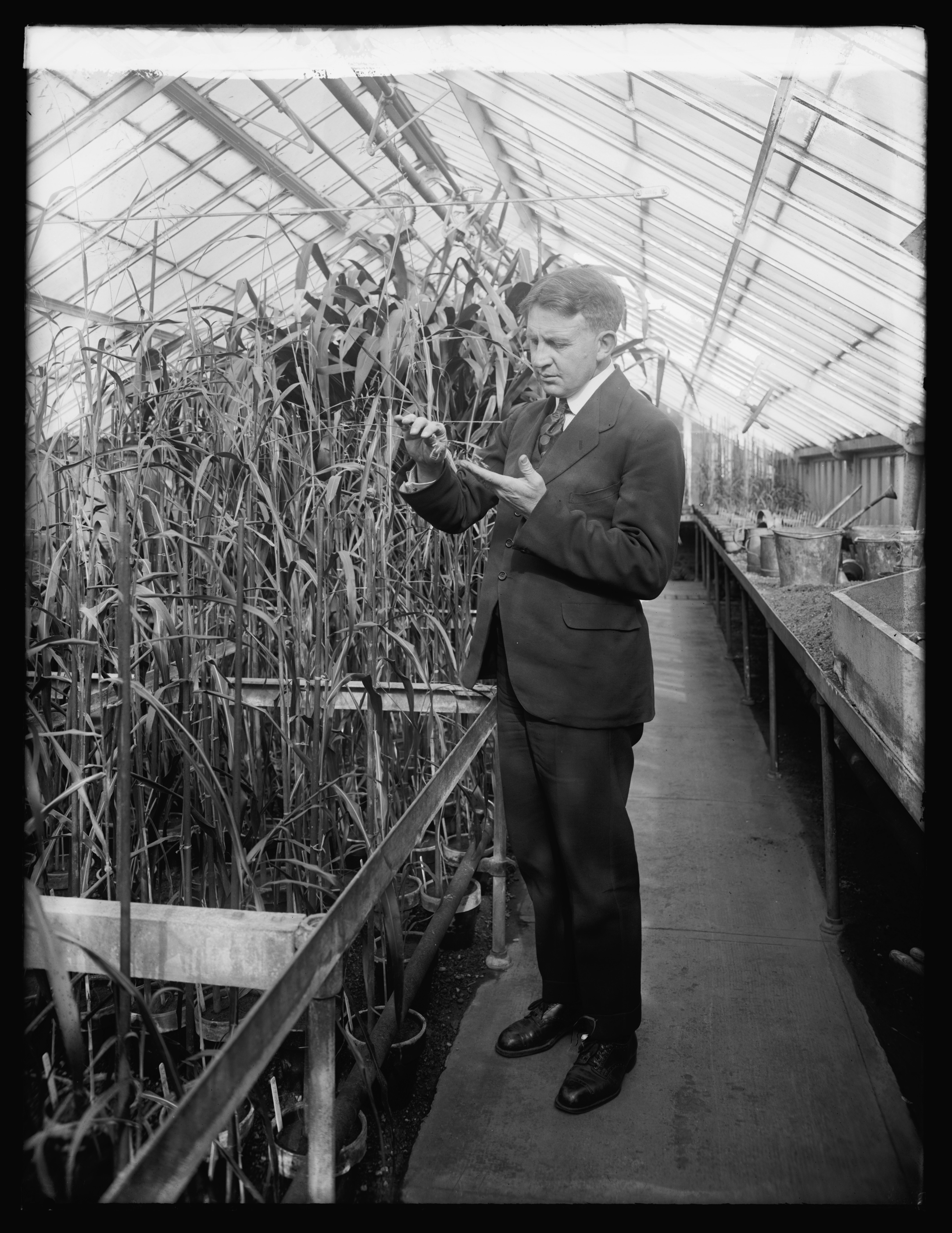
- Born: Kent County, Michigan
- Died: June 23, 1958 (aged 82)
- Education: Colorado College; University of Nebraska
- Scientific career
- Fields: Botany

Homer LeRoy Shantz (1876–1958) was an American botanist and former president of the University of Arizona.

Shantz was born in Kent County, Michigan on January 24, 1876. He was raised in Colorado Springs, Colorado, where his family moved while he was still young. Shantz graduated from Colorado College in 1901 with a bachelor's degree in botany. He received his doctoral degree in botany from the University of Nebraska in 1905. Following graduation until 1908 he taught botany at the state universities in Missouri and Louisiana before accepting a position with the United States Department of Agriculture. He traveled widely, with an emphasis on the American West and Africa, and made documentary photographs wherever he went. Among Shantz's research interests was the photographic documentation of vegetation change. He served as the President of the University of Arizona from 1928 to 1936, where he focused his attention on Arizona and the Sonoran Desert. During this period, he worked with John E. Harrison Jr. in the acquisition of land for the creation of what is now called the Saguaro National Park In 1936, he resigned after disagreements with the legislature and the Board of Regents.

From 1936, he served as Chief of the Division of Wildlife Management of the U.S. Forest Service until he retired in 1944. He later worked with the Geography Branch of the Office of Naval Research to re-photograph many of the sites he had documented earlier in his career.

Shantz died June 23, 1958.
