= Water potential =

Potential energy of water per unit volume relative to water in known conditions

Water potential is the potential energy of water per unit volume relative to pure water in reference conditions. Water potential quantifies the tendency of water to move from one area to another due to osmosis, gravity, mechanical pressure and matrix effects such as capillary action (which is caused by surface tension). The concept of water potential has proved useful in understanding and computing water movement within plants, animals, and soil. Water potential is typically expressed in potential energy per unit volume and very often is represented by the Greek letter ψ.

Water potential integrates a variety of different potential drivers of water movement, which may operate in the same or different directions. Within complex biological systems, many potential factors may be operating simultaneously. For example, the addition of solutes lowers the potential (negative vector), while an increase in pressure increases the potential (positive vector). If the flow is not restricted, water will move from an area of higher water potential to an area that is lower potential. A common example is water with dissolved salts, such as seawater or the fluid in a living cell. These solutions have negative water potential, relative to the pure water reference. With no restriction on flow, water will move from the locus of greater potential (pure water) to the locus of lesser (the solution); flow proceeds until the difference in potential is equalized or balanced by another water potential factor, such as pressure or elevation.Soil moisture is an abiotic factor that affects sapling growth because water is needed for photosynthesis, nutrient transport, and maintaining turgor pressure. Saplings depend on adequate moisture for healthy development, but too little water causes wilting and reduced growth, while too much water can waterlog the soil, reducing oxygen for root respiration and slowing growth.

== Components of water potential ==
Many different factors may affect the total water potential, and the sum of these potentials determines the overall water potential and the direction of water flow:

$\Psi = \Psi_0 + \Psi_\pi + \Psi_p + \Psi_s + \Psi_v + \Psi_m$

where:

- $\Psi_0$ is the reference correction,
- $\Psi_\pi$ is the solute or osmotic potential,
- $\Psi_p$ is the pressure component,
- $\Psi_s$ is the gravimetric component,
- $\Psi_v$ is the potential due to humidity, and
- $\Psi_m$ is the potential due to matrix effects (e.g., fluid cohesion and surface tension.)

All of these factors are quantified as potential energies per unit volume, and different subsets of these terms may be used for particular applications (e.g., plants or soils). Different conditions are also defined as reference depending on the application: for example, in soils, the reference condition is typically defined as pure water at the soil surface.

=== Pressure potential ===
Pressure potential is based on mechanical pressure and is an important component of the total water potential within plant cells. Pressure potential increases as water enters a cell. As water passes through the cell wall and cell membrane, it increases the total amount of water present inside the cell, which exerts an outward pressure that is opposed by the structural rigidity of the cell wall. By creating this pressure, the plant can maintain turgor, which allows the plant to keep its rigidity. Without turgor, plants will lose structure and wilt.

The pressure potential in a plant cell is usually positive. In plasmolysed cells, pressure potential is almost zero. Negative pressure potentials occur when water is pulled through an open system such as a plant xylem vessel. Withstanding negative pressure potentials (frequently called tension) is an important adaptation of the xylem. This tension can be measured empirically using the Pressure bomb.

=== Osmotic potential (solute potential) ===
Pure water is usually defined as having an osmotic potential ($\Psi_\pi$) of zero, and in this case, solute potential can never be positive. The relationship of solute concentration (in molarity) to solute potential is given by the van 't Hoff equation:

$$\Psi_\pi = - MiRT$$

where $M$ is the concentration in molarity of the solute, $i$ is the van 't Hoff factor, the ratio of amount of particles in solution to amount of formula units dissolved, $R$ is the ideal gas constant, and $T$ is the absolute temperature.

The water diffuses across the osmotic membrane to where the water potential is lower

For example, when a solute is dissolved in water, water molecules are less likely to diffuse away via osmosis than when there is no solute. A solution will have a lower and hence more negative water potential than that of pure water. Furthermore, the more solute molecules present, the more negative the solute potential is.

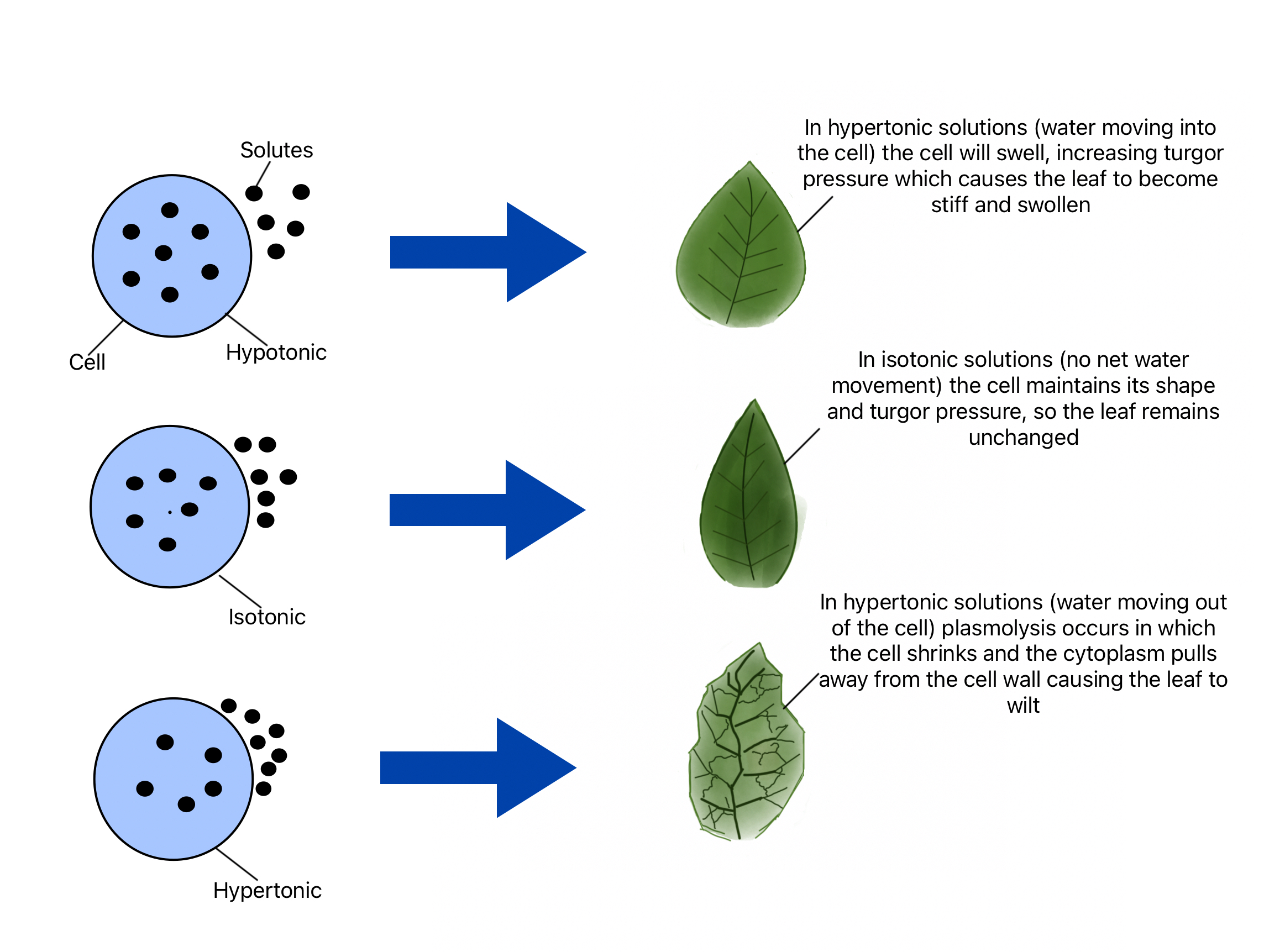

Osmotic potential has important implications for many living organisms. If a living cell is surrounded by a more concentrated solution, the cell will tend to lose water to the more negative water potential ($\Psi_w$) of the surrounding environment. This can be the case for marine organisms living in sea water and halophytic plants growing in saline environments. In the case of a plant cell, the flow of water out of the cell may eventually cause the plasma membrane to pull away from the cell wall, leading to plasmolysis. Most plants, however, have the ability to increase solute inside the cell to drive the flow of water into the cell and maintain turgor.

This effect can be used to power an osmotic power plant.

A soil solution also experiences osmotic potential. The osmotic potential is made possible due to the presence of both inorganic and organic solutes in the soil solution. As water molecules increasingly clump around solute ions or molecules, the freedom of movement, and thus the potential energy, of the water is lowered. As the concentration of solutes is increased, the osmotic potential of the soil solution is reduced. Since water has a tendency to move toward lower energy levels, water will want to travel toward the zone of higher solute concentrations. Although, liquid water will only move in response to such differences in osmotic potential if a semipermeable membrane exists between the zones of high and low osmotic potential. A semipermeable membrane is necessary because it allows water through its membrane while preventing solutes from moving through its membrane. If no membrane is present, movement of the solute, rather than of the water, largely equalizes concentrations.

Since regions of soil are usually not divided by a semipermeable membrane, the osmotic potential typically has a negligible influence on the mass movement of water in soils. On the other hand, osmotic potential has an extreme influence on the rate of water uptake by plants. If soils are high in soluble salts, the osmotic potential is likely to be lower in the soil solution than in the plant root cells. In such cases, the soil solution would severely restrict the rate of water uptake by plants. In salty soils, the osmotic potential of soil water may be so low that the cells in young seedlings start to collapse (plasmolyze).

=== Matrix potential (Matric potential) ===
When water is in contact with solid particles (e.g., clay or sand particles within soil), adhesive intermolecular forces between the water and the solid can be large and important. The forces between the water molecules and the solid particles in combination with attraction among water molecules promote surface tension and the formation of menisci within the solid matrix. Force is then required to break these menisci. The magnitude of matrix potential depends on the distances between solid particles—the width of the menisci (also capillary action and differing Pa at ends of the capillary)—and the chemical composition of the solid matrix (meniscus, macroscopic motion due to ionic attraction).

In many cases, the absolute value of matrix potential can be relatively large in comparison to the other components of water potential discussed above. Matrix potential markedly reduces the energy state of water near particle surfaces. Although water movement due to matrix potential may be slow, it is still extremely important in supplying water to plant roots and in engineering applications. The matrix potential is always negative because the water attracted by the soil matrix has an energy state lower than that of pure water. Matrix potential only occurs in unsaturated soil above the water table. If the matrix potential approaches a value of zero, nearly all soil pores are completely filled with water, i.e. fully saturated and at maximum retentive capacity. The matrix potential can vary considerably among soils. In the case that water drains into less-moist soil zones of similar porosity, the matrix potential is generally in the range of −10 to −30 kPa.

== Empirical examples ==
=== Soil-plant-air continuum ===
At a potential of 0 kPa, the soil is in a saturation state. At saturation, all soil pores are filled with water, and water typically drains from large pores by gravity. At a potential of −33 kPa, or −1/3 bar, (−10 kPa for sand), soil is at field capacity. Typically, at field capacity, air is in the macropores, and water is in the micropores. Field capacity is the optimal condition for plant growth and microbial activity. At a potential of −1500 kPa, the soil is at its permanent wilting point, at which plant roots cannot extract the water through osmotic diffusion. Soil waterways still evaporate at more negative potentials down to a hygroscopic level, at which soil water is held by solid particles in a thin film by molecular adhesion forces.

In contrast, atmospheric water potentials are much more negative—a typical value for dry air is −100 MPa, though this value depends on the temperature and the humidity. Root water potential must be more negative than the soil, and the stem water potential must be an intermediate lower value than the roots but higher than the leaf water potential to create a passive flow of water from the soil to the roots, up the stem, to the leaves and then into the atmosphere.

=== Measurement techniques ===
A tensiometer, electrical resistance gypsum block, neutron probes, or time-domain reflectometry (TDR) can be used to determine soil water potential energy. Tensiometers are limited to 0 to −85 kPa, electrical resistance blocks are limited to −90 to −1500 kPa, neutron probes are limited to 0 to −1500 kPa, and a TDR is limited to 0 to −10,000 kPa. A scale can estimate water weight (percentage composition) if special equipment is not on hand.

== See also ==
- Water retention curve
- Pore water pressure
