= Soil =

Earth, a natural material

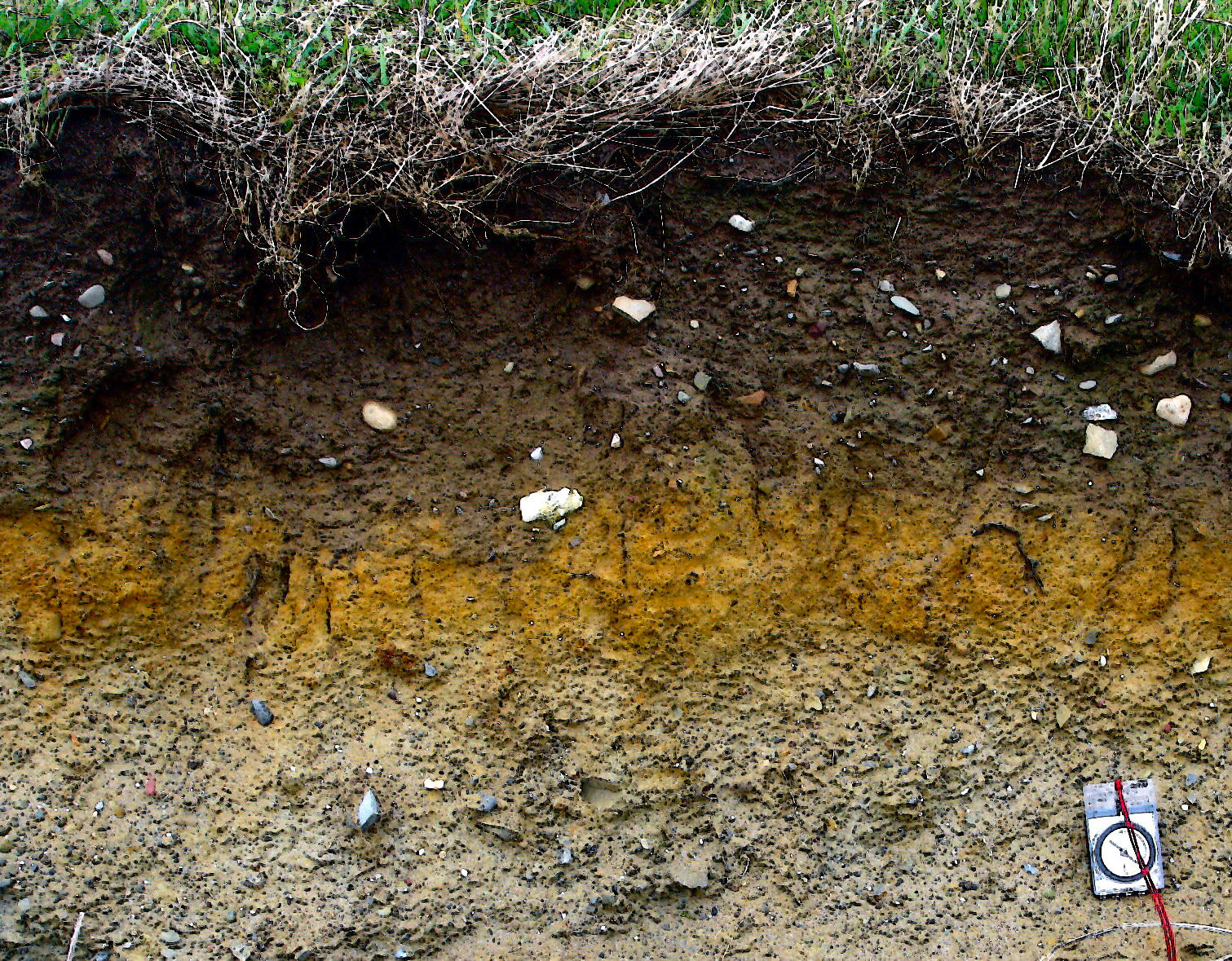
Surface-water-gley developed in glacial till in Northern Ireland

Soil, also commonly referred to as earth, is a mixture of organic matter, minerals, gases, water, and organisms that together support the life of plants and soil organisms. Some scientific definitions distinguish dirt from soil by restricting the former term specifically to displaced soil.

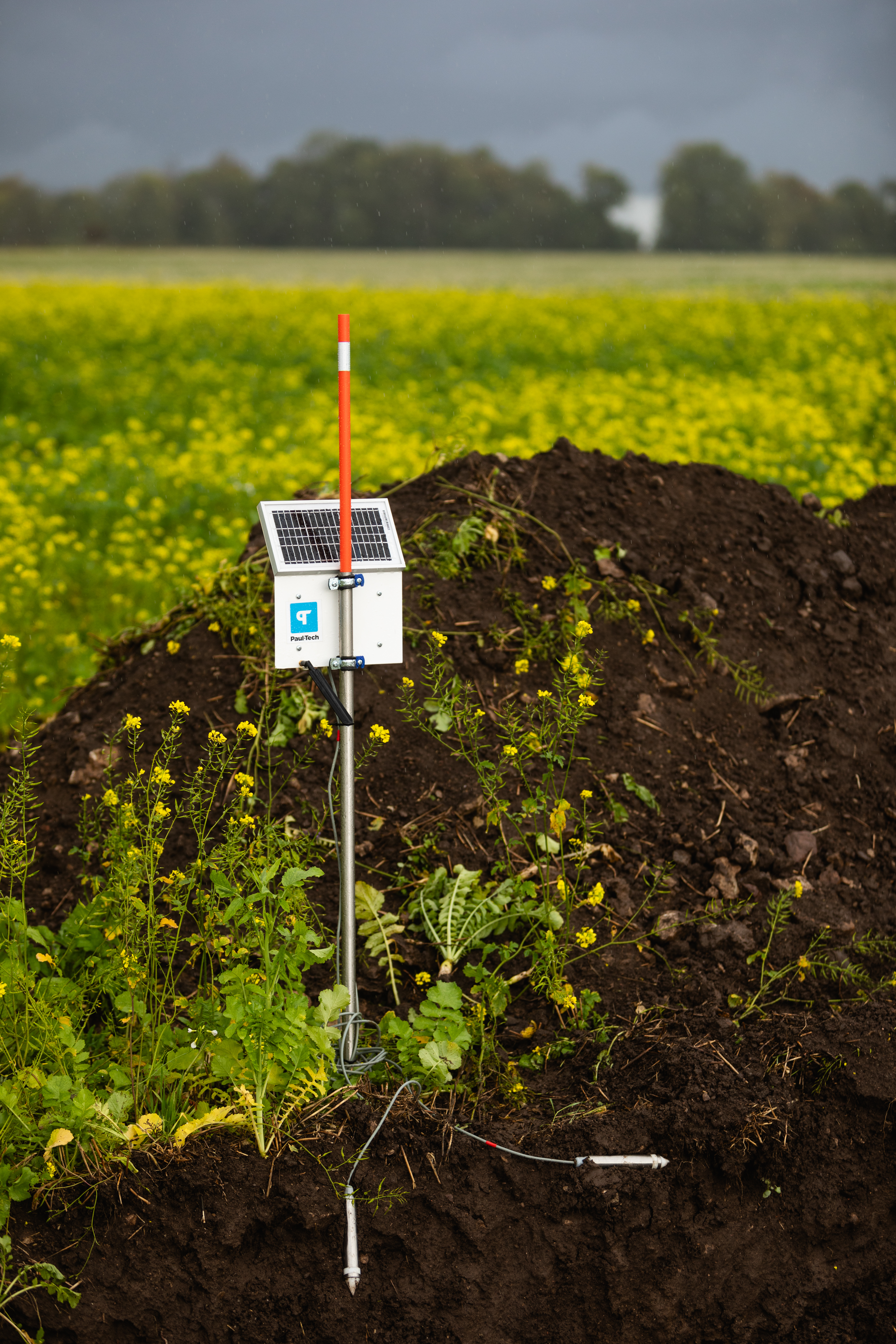
Soil measuring and surveying device

Soil consists of a solid collection of minerals and organic matter (the soil matrix), as well as a porous phase (Pore space) that holds gases (the soil atmosphere) and a liquid phase that holds water and dissolved substances both organic and inorganic, in ionic or in molecular form (the soil solution). Accordingly, soil is a complex three-state system of solids, liquids, and gases. Soil is a product of several factors: the influence of climate, relief (elevation, orientation, and slope of terrain), organisms, and the soil's parent materials (original minerals) interacting over time. It continually undergoes development through numerous physical, chemical, and biological processes, which include weathering with associated erosion. Given its complexity and strong internal connectedness, soil ecologists regard soil as an ecosystem.

Most soils have a dry bulk density (density of soil taking into account voids when dry) between 1.1 and 1.6 g/cm^{3}, though the soil particle density is much higher, in the range of 2.6 to 2.7 g/cm^{3}. Little of the soil of planet Earth is older than the Pleistocene and none is older than the Cenozoic, although fossilized soils are preserved from as far back as the Archean.

Collectively, the Earth's body of soil is called the pedosphere. The pedosphere interfaces with the lithosphere, the hydrosphere, the atmosphere, and the biosphere. Soil has four important functions:

- as a medium for plant growth
- as a means of water storage, water supply, and water purification
- as a modifier of Earth's atmosphere
- as a habitat for soil organisms

All of these functions, in their turn, modify the soil and its properties.

Soil science has two basic branches of study: edaphology and pedology. Edaphology studies the influence of soils on living things. Pedology focuses on the formation, description (morphology), and classification of soils in their natural environment. In engineering terms, soil is included in the broader concept of regolith, which also includes other loose material that lies above the bedrock, as can be found on the Moon and other celestial objects.

== Functions ==
Soil acts as an engineering medium, a habitat for soil organisms, a recycling system for nutrients and organic wastes, a regulator of water quality, a modifier of atmospheric composition, and a medium for plant growth, making it a critically important provider of ecosystem services. Since soil has a tremendous range of available niches and habitats, it contains a prominent part of the Earth's genetic diversity. A gram of soil can contain billions of organisms, belonging to thousands of species, mostly microbial and largely still unexplored. Soil has a mean prokaryotic density of roughly 10^{8} organisms per gram, whereas the ocean has no more than 10^{7} prokaryotic organisms per milliliter (gram) of seawater. Organic carbon held in soil is eventually returned to the atmosphere through the process of respiration carried out by heterotrophic organisms, but a substantial part is retained in the soil in the form of soil organic matter; tillage usually increases the rate of soil respiration, leading to the depletion of soil organic matter. Since plant roots need oxygen, aeration is an important characteristic of soil. This ventilation can be accomplished via networks of interconnected soil pores, which also absorb and hold rainwater making it readily available for uptake by plants. Since plants require a nearly continuous supply of water, but most regions receive sporadic rainfall, the water-holding capacity of soils is vital for plant survival.

Soils can effectively remove impurities, kill disease agents, and degrade contaminants, this latter property being called natural attenuation. Typically, soils maintain a net absorption of oxygen and methane and undergo a net release of carbon dioxide and nitrous oxide. Soils offer plants physical support, air, water, temperature moderation, nutrients, and protection from toxins. Soils provide readily available nutrients to plants and animals by converting dead organic matter into various nutrient forms.

Soil is a major component of the Earth's ecosystem. The world's ecosystems are impacted in far-reaching ways by the processes carried out in the soil, with effects ranging from ozone depletion and global warming to rainforest destruction and water pollution. With respect to Earth's carbon cycle, soil acts as an important carbon reservoir, and it is potentially one of the most reactive to human disturbance and climate change. As the planet warms, it has been predicted that soils will add carbon dioxide to the atmosphere due to increased biological activity at higher temperatures, a positive feedback (amplification). This prediction has, however, been questioned on consideration of more recent knowledge on soil carbon turnover.

== Composition ==
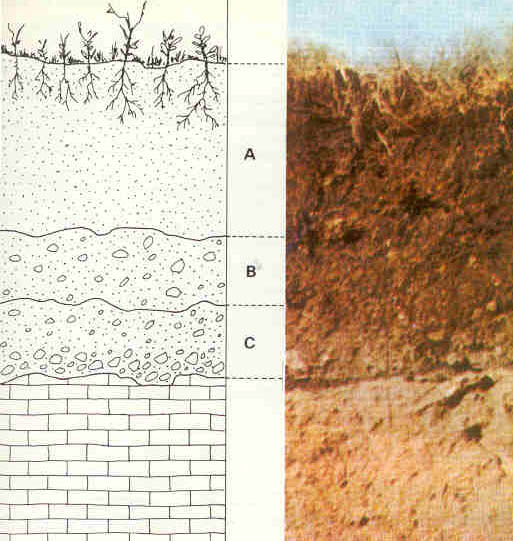
A, B, and C represent the soil profile, a notation firstly coined by Vasily Dokuchaev (1846–1903), the father of pedology. Here, A is the topsoil; B is a regolith; C is a saprolite (a less-weathered regolith); the bottom-most layer represents the bedrock.

Components of a silt loam soil by percent volume
1. Water (25.0%)
2. Gases (25.0%)
3. Sand (18.0%)
4. Silt (18.0%)
5. Clay (9.00%)
6. Organic matter (5.00%)

A typical soil is about 50% solids (45% mineral and 5% organic matter), and 50% voids (or pores) of which half is occupied by water and half by gas. The percent soil mineral and organic content can be treated as a constant (in the short term), while the percent soil water and gas content is considered highly variable whereby a rise in one is simultaneously balanced by a reduction in the other. The pore space allows for the infiltration and movement of air and water, both of which are critical for life existing in soil. Compaction, a common problem with soils, in particular under heavy machinery traffic, reduces this space, preventing air and water from reaching plant roots and soil organisms.

Given sufficient time, an undifferentiated soil will evolve a soil profile that consists of two or more layers, referred to as soil horizons. These differ in one or more properties such as in their texture, structure, density, porosity, consistency, temperature, color, and reactivity. The horizons differ greatly in thickness and generally lack sharp boundaries; their development is dependent on the type of parent material, the processes that modify those parent materials (e.g. mineral weathering), and the soil-forming factors that influence those processes. The biological influences on soil properties (e.g. bioturbation) are strongest near the surface, while the geochemical influences on soil properties increase with depth. Mature soil profiles typically include three basic master horizons: A, B, and C. The solum normally includes the A and B horizons. The living component of the soil is largely confined to the solum, and is generally more prominent in the A horizon. It has been suggested that the pedon, a column of soil extending vertically from the surface to the underlying parent material and large enough to show the characteristics of all its horizons, could be subdivided in the humipedon (the living part, where most soil organisms are dwelling, corresponding to the humus form), the copedon (in intermediary position, where most weathering of minerals takes place) and the lithopedon (in contact with the subsoil).

The soil texture is determined by the relative proportions of the individual particles of sand, silt, and clay that make up the soil.

A soil texture triangle plot is a visual representation of the proportions of sand, silt, and clay in a soil sample.

The interaction of the individual mineral particles with organic matter, water, gases via biotic and abiotic processes causes those particles to flocculate (stick together) to form aggregates or peds. Where these aggregates can be identified, a soil can be said to be developed, and can be described further in terms of color, porosity, consistency, reaction (acidity), etc.

Water is a critical agent in soil development due to its involvement in the dissolution, precipitation, erosion, transport, and deposition of the materials of which a soil is composed. The mixture of water and dissolved or suspended materials that occupy the soil pore space is called the soil solution. Since soil water is never pure water, but contains hundreds of dissolved organic and mineral substances, it may be more accurately called the soil solution. Water is central to the dissolution, precipitation and leaching of minerals from the soil profile. Finally, water affects the type of vegetation that grows in a soil, which in turn affects the development of the soil, a complex feedback which is exemplified in the dynamics of banded vegetation patterns in semi-arid regions.

Soils supply plants with nutrients, most of which are held in place by particles of clay and organic matter (colloids) The nutrients may be adsorbed on clay mineral surfaces, bound within clay minerals (absorbed), or bound within organic compounds as part of the living organisms or dead soil organic matter (humus). These bound nutrients interact with soil water to buffer the soil solution composition (attenuate changes in the soil solution) as soils wet up or dry out, as plants take up nutrients, as salts are leached, or as acids or alkalis are added.

Plant nutrient availability is affected by soil pH, which is a measure of the hydrogen ion activity in the soil solution. Soil pH is a function of many soil forming factors, and is generally lower (more acidic) where weathering is more advanced.

Most plant nutrients, with the exception of nitrogen, fixed from the atmosphere, originate from the minerals that make up the soil parent material. Some nitrogen also originates from rain as dilute nitric acid and ammonia, but most of the nitrogen is available in soils as a result of nitrogen fixation by diazotroph bacteria (e.g. cyanobacteria with heterocysts, Clostridium). Once in the soil-plant system, most nutrients are recycled through living organisms, plant and microbial residues (soil organic matter), mineral-bound forms (humus), and the soil solution. Both living soil organisms (microbes, animals and plant roots) and soil organic matter are of critical importance to this recycling, and thereby to soil formation and soil fertility. Microbial enzymes may release nutrients from minerals or organic matter for use by plants and other microorganisms, sequester (incorporate) them into living cells, or cause their loss from the soil by volatilisation (loss to the atmosphere as gases) or leaching.

== Formation ==
Soil is said to be formed when organic matter has accumulated and colloids are washed downward, leaving deposits of clay, humus, iron oxide, carbonate, and gypsum, producing a distinct layer called the B horizon. This is a somewhat arbitrary definition as mixtures of sand, silt, clay and humus will support biological and agricultural activity before that time. These constituents are moved from one level to another by water (leaching) and animal activity (bioturbation). As a result, layers (horizons) form in the soil profile. The alteration (weathering) and movement of materials within a soil causes the formation of distinctive soil horizons. However, more recent definitions of soil embrace soils without any organic matter, such as those regoliths that formed on Mars and analogous conditions in planet Earth deserts.

An example of the development of a soil would begin with the weathering of lava flow bedrock, which would produce the purely mineral-based parent material from which the soil texture forms. Soil development would proceed most rapidly from bare rock of recent flows in a warm climate, under heavy and frequent rainfall. Under such conditions, plants (in a first stage nitrogen-fixing lichens and cyanobacteria then epilithic higher plants) become established very quickly on basaltic lava, even though there is very little organic material. Basaltic minerals commonly weather relatively quickly, according to the Goldich dissolution series. The plants are supported by the porous rock as it is filled with nutrient-bearing water that carries minerals dissolved from the rocks. Crevasses and pockets, local topography of the rocks, would hold fine materials and harbour plant roots. The developing plant roots are associated with mineral-weathering mycorrhizal fungi that assist in breaking up the porous lava, and by these means organic matter and a finer mineral soil accumulate with time. Such initial stages of soil development have been described on volcanoes, inselbergs, and glacial moraines.

Soil formation is governed by five interrelated soil formation factors — climate (CL), organisms (O), topography or relief (R), parent material (P), and time (T) — which together drive the development and evolution of soil. Soil formation factors are often referred to by the acronym CLORPT.

== Physical properties ==
The physical properties of soils, in order of decreasing importance for ecosystem services such as crop production, are texture, structure, bulk density, porosity, consistency, temperature, colour and resistivity. Soil texture is determined by the relative proportion of the three kinds of soil mineral particles, called soil separates: sand, silt, and clay. At the next larger scale, soil structures called peds or more commonly soil aggregates are created from the soil separates when iron oxides, carbonates, clay, silica and humus, coat particles and cause them to adhere into larger, relatively stable secondary structures. Soil bulk density, when determined at standardized moisture conditions, is an estimate of soil compaction. Soil porosity consists of the void part of the soil volume and is occupied by gases or water. Soil consistency is the ability of soil materials to stick together. Soil temperature and colour are self-defining. Resistivity refers to the resistance to conduction of electric currents and affects the rate of corrosion of metal and concrete structures which are buried in soil. These properties vary through the depth of a soil profile, i.e. through soil horizons. Most of these properties determine the aeration of the soil and the ability of water to infiltrate and to be held within the soil.

== Soil moisture ==
Soil water content can be measured as volume or weight. Soil moisture levels, in order of decreasing water content, are saturation, field capacity, wilting point, air dry, and oven dry. Field capacity describes a drained wet soil at the point water content reaches equilibrium with gravity. Irrigating soil above field capacity risks percolation losses. Wilting point describes the dry limit for growing plants. During growing season, soil moisture is unaffected by plant functional groups or species richness while it varies with species composition.

Available water capacity is the amount of water held in a soil profile available to plants. As water content drops, plants have to work against increasing forces of adhesion and sorptivity to withdraw water. Irrigation scheduling avoids moisture stress by replenishing depleted water before stress is induced.

Capillary action is responsible for moving groundwater from wet regions of the soil to dry areas. Subirrigation designs (e.g., wicking beds, sub-irrigated planters) rely on capillarity to supply water to plant roots. Capillary action can result in an evaporative concentration of salts, causing land degradation through salination.

Soil moisture measurement—measuring the water content of the soil, as can be expressed in terms of volume or weight—can be based on in situ probes (e.g., capacitance probes, neutron probes), or remote sensing methods. Soil moisture measurement is an important factor in determining changes in soil biological activity.

== Soil gas ==
The atmosphere of soil, or soil gas, is very different from the atmosphere above. The consumption of oxygen by microbes and plant roots, and their release of carbon dioxide, decreases oxygen and increases carbon dioxide concentration. Atmospheric CO_{2} concentration is 0.04%, but in the soil pore space it may range from 10 to 100 times that level, thus potentially contributing to the inhibition of root respiration. Calcareous soils regulate CO_{2} concentration by carbonate buffering, contrary to acid soils in which all CO_{2} respired accumulates in the soil pore system. At extreme levels, CO_{2} is toxic. This suggests a possible negative feedback control of soil CO_{2} concentration through its inhibitory effects on root and microbial respiration (also called soil respiration). In addition, the soil voids are saturated with water vapour, at least until the point of maximal hygroscopicity, beyond which a vapour-pressure deficit occurs in the soil pore space. Adequate porosity is necessary, not just to allow the penetration of water, but also to allow gases to diffuse in and out. Movement of gases is by diffusion from high concentrations to lower, the diffusion coefficient decreasing with soil compaction. Oxygen from above atmosphere diffuses in the soil where it is consumed and levels of carbon dioxide in excess of above atmosphere diffuse out with other gases (including greenhouse gases) as well as water vapor. Soil texture and structure strongly affect soil porosity and gas diffusion. It is the total pore space (porosity) of soil, not the pore size, and the degree of pore interconnection (or conversely pore sealing), together with water content, air turbulence and temperature, that determine the rate of diffusion of gases into and out of soil. Platy soil structure and soil compaction (low porosity) impede gas flow, and a deficiency of oxygen may encourage anaerobic bacteria to reduce (strip oxygen) from nitrate NO_{3} to the gases N_{2}, N_{2}O, and NO, which are then lost to the atmosphere, thereby depleting the soil of nitrogen, a detrimental process called denitrification. Aerated soil is also a net sink of methane (CH_{4}) but a net producer of methane (a strong heat-trapping greenhouse gas) when soils are depleted of oxygen and subject to elevated temperatures.

Soil atmosphere is also the seat of emissions of volatiles other than carbon and nitrogen oxides from various soil organisms, e.g. roots, bacteria, fungi, animals. These volatiles are used as chemical cues, making soil atmosphere the seat of interaction networks playing a decisive role in the stability, dynamics and evolution of soil ecosystems. Biogenic soil volatile organic compounds are exchanged with the aboveground atmosphere, in which they are just 1–2 orders of magnitude lower than those from aboveground vegetation.

Humans can get some idea of the soil atmosphere through the well-known 'after-the-rain' scent, when infiltering rainwater flushes out the whole soil atmosphere after a drought period, or when soil is excavated, a bulk property attributed in a reductionist manner to particular biochemical compounds such as petrichor or geosmin.

== Solid phase (soil matrix) ==
Soil particles can be classified by their chemical composition (mineralogy) as well as their size. The particle size distribution of a soil, its texture, determines many of the properties of that soil, in particular hydraulic conductivity and water potential, but the mineralogy of those particles can strongly modify those properties. The mineralogy of the finest soil particles, clay, is especially important.

== Soil biodiversity ==
Large numbers of microbes, animals, plants and fungi are living in soil. However, biodiversity in soil is much harder to study as most of this life is invisible, hence estimates about soil biodiversity have been unsatisfactory. A recent study suggested that soil is likely home to 59 ± 15% of the species on Earth. Enchytraeidae (potworms) have the greatest percentage of their species living in soil (98.6%), followed by fungi (90%), plants (85.5%), and termites (Isoptera) (84.2%). Many other groups of animals have substantial fractions of species living in soil, e.g. about 30% of insects, and close to 50% of arachnids. While most vertebrates live above ground (ignoring aquatic species), many species are fossorial, that is, they live in soil (e.g. moles, pocket gophers, voles, blind snakes), an adaptation to subterranean life thought to be inherited from past global ecological crises.

== Chemistry ==
The chemistry of a soil determines its ability to supply available plant nutrients and affects its physical properties and the health of its living population. In addition, a soil's chemistry also determines its corrosivity, stability, and ability to absorb pollutants and to filter water. It is the surface chemistry of mineral and organic colloids that determines soil's chemical properties. A colloid is a small, insoluble particle ranging in size from 1 nanometer to 1 micrometer, thus small enough to remain suspended by Brownian motion in a fluid medium without settling. Most soils contain organic colloidal particles called humus as well as the inorganic colloidal particles of clays. The very high specific surface area of colloids and their net electrical charges give soil its ability to hold and release ions. Negatively charged sites on colloids attract and release cations in what is referred to as cation exchange. Cation-exchange capacity is the amount of exchangeable cations per unit weight of dry soil and is expressed in terms of milliequivalents of positively charged ions per 100 grams of soil (or centimoles of positive charge per kilogram of soil; cmol_{c}/kg). Similarly, positively charged sites on colloids can attract and release anions in the soil, giving the soil anion-exchange capacity.

=== Cation and anion exchange ===
The cation exchange, that takes place between colloids and soil water, buffers (moderates) soil pH, alters soil structure, and purifies percolating water by adsorbing cations of all types, both useful and harmful.

The negative or positive charges on colloid particles make them able to hold cations or anions, respectively, to their surfaces. The charges result from four sources.

1. Isomorphous substitution occurs in clay during its formation, when lower-valence cations substitute for higher-valence cations in the crystal structure. Substitutions in the outermost layers are more effective than for the innermost layers, as the electric charge strength drops off as the square of the distance. The net result is oxygen atoms with net negative charge and the ability to attract cations.
2. Edge-of-clay oxygen atoms are not in balance ionically as the tetrahedral and octahedral structures are incomplete.
3. Hydroxyls may substitute for oxygens of the silica layers, a process called hydroxylation. When the hydrogens of the clay hydroxyls are ionised into solution, they leave the oxygen with a negative charge (anionic clays).
4. Hydrogens of humus hydroxyl groups may also be ionised into solution, leaving, similarly to clay, an oxygen with a negative charge.

Cations held to the negatively charged colloids resist being washed downward by water and are at first out of reach of plant roots, thereby preserving the soil fertility in areas of moderate rainfall and low temperatures.

There is a hierarchy in the process of cation exchange on colloids, as cations differ in the strength of adsorption by the colloid and hence their ability to replace one another (ion exchange). If present in equal amounts in the soil water solution:

Al^{3+} replaces H^{+} replaces Ca^{2+} replaces Mg^{2+} replaces K^{+} same as NH^{+}_{4} replaces Na^{+}

If one cation is added in large amounts, it may replace the others by the sheer force of its numbers. This is called law of mass action. This is largely what occurs with the addition of cationic fertilisers (potash, lime).

As the soil solution becomes more acidic (low pH, meaning an abundance of H^{+}), the other cations more weakly bound to colloids are pushed into solution as hydrogen ions occupy exchange sites (protonation). A low pH may cause the hydrogen of hydroxyl groups to be pulled into solution, leaving charged sites on the colloid available to be occupied by other cations. This ionisation of hydroxy groups on the surface of soil colloids creates what is described as pH-dependent surface charges. Unlike permanent charges developed by isomorphous substitution, pH-dependent charges are variable and increase with increasing pH. Freed cations can be made available to plants but are also prone to be leached from the soil, possibly making the soil less fertile. Plants are able to excrete H^{+} into the soil through the synthesis of organic acids and by that means, change the pH of the soil near the root and push cations off the colloids, thus making those available to the plant.

==== Cation exchange capacity (CEC) ====
Cation exchange capacity is the soil's ability to remove cations from the soil water solution and sequester those to be exchanged later as the plant roots release hydrogen ions to the solution. CEC is the amount of exchangeable hydrogen cations (H^{+}) that will combine with 100 grams dry weight of soil and whose measure is one milliequivalent per 100 grams of soil (1 meq/100 g). Hydrogen ions have a single charge and one-thousandth of a gram (1 mg) of hydrogen ions per 100 grams dry soil gives a measure of one milliequivalent of hydrogen ion. Calcium, with an atomic weight 40 times that of hydrogen and with a valence of two, converts to (40 ÷ 2) × 1 milliequivalent = 20 milliequivalents of hydrogen ion per 100 grams of dry soil or 20 meq/100 g. The modern measure of CEC is expressed as centimoles of positive charge per kilogram (cmol/kg) of oven-dry soil.

Most of the soil's CEC occurs on clay and humus colloids, and the lack of those in hot, humid, wet climates (such as tropical rainforests), due to fast leaching and decomposition, respectively, explains the apparent lack of fertility of tropical soils. Live plant roots also have some CEC, linked to their specific surface area.

Cation exchange capacity for soils; soil textures; soil colloids
| Soil | State | CEC meq/100 g |
|---|---|---|
| Charlotte fine sand | Florida | 1.0 |
| Ruston fine sandy loam | Texas | 1.9 |
| Glouchester loam | New Jersey | 11.9 |
| Grundy silt loam | Illinois | 26.3 |
| Gleason clay loam | California | 31.6 |
| Susquehanna clay loam | Alabama | 34.3 |
| Davie mucky fine sand | Florida | 100.8 |
| Sands | —N/a | 1–5 |
| Fine sandy loams | —N/a | 5–10 |
| Loams and silt loams | —N/a | 5–15 |
| Clay loams | —N/a | 15–30 |
| Clays | —N/a | over 30 |
| Sesquioxides | —N/a | 0–3 |
| Kaolinite | —N/a | 3–15 |
| Illite | —N/a | 25–40 |
| Montmorillonite | —N/a | 60–100 |
| Vermiculite (similar to illite) | —N/a | 80–150 |
| Humus | —N/a | 100–300 |

==== Anion exchange capacity (AEC) ====
Anion exchange capacity is the soil's ability to remove anions (such as nitrate, phosphate) from the soil water solution and sequester those for later exchange as the plant roots release carbonate anions to the soil water solution. Those colloids which have low CEC tend to have some AEC. Amorphous and sesquioxide clays have the highest AEC, followed by the iron oxides. Levels of AEC are much lower than for CEC, because of the generally higher rate of positively (versus negatively) charged surfaces on soil colloids, to the exception of variable-charge soils. Phosphates tend to be held at anion exchange sites.

Iron and aluminum hydroxide clays are able to exchange their hydroxide anions (OH^{−}) for other anions. The order reflecting the strength of anion adhesion is as follows:

H_{2}PO^{−}_{4} replaces SO^{2−}_{4} replaces NO^{−}_{3} replaces Cl^{−}

The amount of exchangeable anions is of a magnitude of tenths to a few milliequivalents per 100 g dry soil. As pH rises, there are relatively more hydroxyls, which will displace anions from the colloids and force them into solution and out of storage; hence AEC decreases with increasing pH (alkalinity).

=== Reactivity (pH) ===
Soil reactivity is expressed in terms of pH and is a measure of the acidity or alkalinity of the soil. More precisely, it is a measure of hydronium concentration in an aqueous solution and ranges in values from 0 to 14 (acidic to basic) but practically speaking for soils, pH ranges from 3.5 to 9.5, as pH values beyond those extremes are toxic to life forms.

At 25 °C an aqueous solution that has a pH of 3.5 has 10^{−3.5} moles H_{3}O^{+} (hydronium ions) per litre of solution (and also 10^{−10.5} moles per litre OH^{−}). A pH of 7, defined as neutral, has 10^{−7} moles of hydronium ions per litre of solution and also 10^{−7} moles of OH^{−} per litre; since the two concentrations are equal, they are said to neutralise each other. A pH of 9.5 has 10^{−9.5} moles hydronium ions per litre of solution (and also 10^{−2.5} moles per litre OH^{−}). A pH of 3.5 has one million times more hydronium ions per litre than a solution with pH of 9.5 (9.5 − 3.5 = 6 or 10^{6}) and is thus more acidic.

The effect of pH on a soil is to remove from the soil or to make available certain ions. Soils with high acidity tend to have toxic amounts of aluminium and manganese. As a result of a trade-off between toxicity and requirement most nutrients are better available to plants at moderate pH, although most minerals are more soluble (weatherable) in acid soils. Soil organisms are hindered by high acidity, and most agricultural crops do best with mineral soils of pH 6.5 and organic soils of pH 5.5. Given that at low pH toxic metals (e.g. aluminium, cadmium, zinc, lead) are positively charged as cations and organic pollutants are in non-ionic form, thus both are made more available to organisms, it has been suggested that plants, animals and microbes commonly living in acid soils are pre-adapted to every kind of pollution, whether of natural or human origin.

In high rainfall areas, soils tend to acidify as the basic cations are forced off the soil colloids by the mass action of hydronium ions from usual or unusual rain acidity against those attached to the colloids. High rainfall rates can then wash the nutrients out, leaving the soil inhabited only by those organisms which are particularly efficient to uptake nutrients in very acid conditions, like in tropical rainforests. Once the colloids are saturated with H_{3}O^{+}, the addition of any more hydronium ions or aluminum hydroxyl cations drives the pH even lower (more acidic) as the soil has been left with no buffering capacity. In areas of extreme rainfall and high temperatures, clay and humus may be washed out, further reducing the buffering capacity of the soil. In low rainfall areas, unleached calcium pushes pH to 8.5 and with the addition of exchangeable sodium, soils may reach pH 10. Beyond a pH of 9, plant growth is reduced. High pH results in low micro-nutrient mobility, but water-soluble chelates of those nutrients can correct the deficit. Sodium can be reduced by the addition of gypsum (calcium sulphate) as calcium adheres to clay more tightly than does sodium causing sodium to be pushed into the soil water solution where it can be washed out by an abundance of water.

==== Base saturation percentage ====
There are acid-forming cations (e.g. hydronium, aluminium, iron) and there are base-forming cations (e.g. calcium, magnesium, sodium). The fraction of the negatively-charged soil colloid exchange sites (CEC) that are occupied by base-forming cations is called base saturation. If a soil has a CEC of 20 meq and 5 meq are aluminium and hydronium cations (acid-forming), the remainder of positions on the colloids (20 − 5 = 15 meq) are assumed occupied by base-forming cations, so that the base saturation is 15 ÷ 20 × 100% = 75% (the compliment 25% is assumed acid-forming cations). Base saturation is almost in direct proportion to pH (it increases with increasing pH). It is of use in calculating the amount of lime needed to neutralise an acid soil (lime requirement). The amount of lime needed to neutralize a soil must take account of the amount of acid forming ions on the colloids (exchangeable acidity), not just those in the soil water solution (free acidity). The addition of enough lime to neutralize the soil water solution will be insufficient to change the pH, as the acid forming cations stored on the soil colloids will tend to restore the original pH condition as they are pushed off those colloids by the calcium of the added lime.

==== Buffering ====
The resistance of soil to change in pH, as a result of the addition of acid or basic material, is a measure of the buffering capacity of a soil and (for a particular soil type) increases as the CEC increases. Hence, pure sand has almost no buffering ability, though soils high in colloids (whether mineral or organic) have high buffering capacity. Buffering occurs by cation exchange and neutralisation. However, colloids are not the only regulators of soil pH. The role of carbonates should be underlined, too. More generally, according to pH levels, several buffer systems take precedence over each other, from calcium carbonate buffer range to iron buffer range.

=== Redox ===
Soil chemical reactions involve some combination of proton and electron transfer. Oxidation occurs if there is a loss of electrons in the transfer process while reduction occurs if there is a gain of electrons. Reduction potential is measured in volts or millivolts. Soil microbial communities develop along electron transport chains, forming electrically conductive biofilms, and developing networks of bacterial nanowires.

Redox factors act on soil development, with redoximorphic color features providing critical information for soil interpretation. Understanding the redox gradient is important to managing carbon sequestration, bioremediation, wetland delineation, and soil-based microbial fuel cells.

== Nutrients ==
Plant nutrients, their chemical symbols, and the ionic forms common in soils and available for plant uptake
| Element | Symbol | Ion or molecule |
|---|---|---|
| Carbon | C | CO_{2} (mostly through leaves) |
| Hydrogen | H | H^{+}, H_{2}O (water) |
| Oxygen | O | O^{2−}, OH^{−}, CO^{2−}_{3}, SO^{2−}_{4}, CO_{2} |
| Phosphorus | P | H_{2}PO^{−}_{4}, HPO^{2−}_{4} (phosphates) |
| Potassium | K | K^{+} |
| Nitrogen | N | NH^{+}_{4}, NO^{−}_{3} (ammonium, nitrate) |
| Sulfur | S | SO^{2−}_{4} |
| Calcium | Ca | Ca^{2+} |
| Iron | Fe | Fe^{2+}, Fe^{3+} (ferrous, ferric) |
| Magnesium | Mg | Mg^{2+} |
| Boron | B | H_{3}BO_{3}, H_{2}BO^{−}_{3}, B(OH)^{−}_{4} |
| Manganese | Mn | Mn^{2+} |
| Copper | Cu | Cu^{2+} |
| Zinc | Zn | Zn^{2+} |
| Molybdenum | Mo | MoO^{2−}_{4} (molybdate) |
| Chlorine | Cl | Cl^{−} (chloride) |

Seventeen elements or nutrients are essential for plant growth and reproduction. They are carbon (C), hydrogen (H), oxygen (O), nitrogen (N), phosphorus (P), potassium (K), sulfur (S), calcium (Ca), magnesium (Mg), iron (Fe), boron (B), manganese (Mn), copper (Cu), zinc (Zn), molybdenum (Mo), nickel (Ni) and chlorine (Cl). Nutrients required for plants to complete their life cycle are considered essential nutrients. Nutrients that enhance the growth of plants but are not necessary to complete the plant's life cycle are considered non-essential. Except for carbon, hydrogen, and oxygen, which are supplied by carbon dioxide and water, and nitrogen, provided through nitrogen fixation, the nutrients derive originally from the mineral component of the soil. The law of the minimum expresses that when the available form of a nutrient is not in enough proportion in the soil solution, other nutrients cannot be taken up at an optimum rate by a plant. A particular nutrient ratio (stoichiometry) of the soil solution is thus mandatory for optimizing plant growth, a value which might differ from nutrient ratios calculated from plant composition.

Plant uptake of nutrients can only proceed when present in a plant-available form. In most situations, nutrients are absorbed in an ionic form from (or together with) soil water. Although minerals are the origin of most nutrients, and the bulk of most nutrient elements in the soil is held in crystalline form within primary and secondary minerals, they weather too slowly to support rapid plant growth. For example, the application of finely ground minerals, feldspar and apatite, to soil seldom provides the necessary amounts of potassium and phosphorus at a rate sufficient for good plant growth, as most of the nutrients remain bound in the crystals of those minerals. However, plants are able to stimulate mineral weathering, and thus the availability of mineral-bound nutrients, through various processes, both direct (e.g. weathering agents such as carbon dioxide, organic acids and ligands) and indirect (e.g. mycorrhizal fungi, rhizosphere bacteria).

The nutrients adsorbed onto the surfaces of clay colloids and soil organic matter provide a more accessible reservoir of many plant nutrients (e.g., K, Ca, Mg, P, Zn). As plants absorb the nutrients from the soil water, the soluble pool is replenished from the surface-bound pool. The decomposition of soil organic matter by microorganisms is another mechanism whereby the soluble pool of nutrients is replenished – this is important for the supply of plant-available N, S, P, and B from soil.

Gram for gram, the capacity of humus to hold nutrients and water is far greater than that of clay minerals, most of the soil cation exchange capacity arising from charged carboxylic groups on organic matter. However, despite the remarkable capacity of humus to retain water once water-soaked, its high hydrophobicity decreases its wettability once dry, a non-reversible process called hysteresis. Small amounts of humus may remarkably increase the soil's capacity to promote plant growth.

== Soil organic matter ==
The organic material in soil is made up of organic compounds and includes plant, animal and microbial material, both living and dead. A typical soil has a biomass composition of 70% microorganisms, 22% macrofauna, and 8% roots. The living component of an acre of soil may include 900 lb of earthworms, 2400 lb of fungi, 1500 lb of bacteria, 133 lb of protozoa and 890 lb of arthropods and algae.

A few percent of the soil organic matter, with small residence time, consists of the microbial biomass and metabolites of bacteria, molds, and actinomycetes that work to break down the dead organic matter. Were it not for the mineralizing action of these microorganisms, the entire carbon dioxide part of the atmosphere would be sequestered as organic matter in the soil. However, in the same time soil microbes contribute to carbon sequestration in the topsoil through the formation of stable humus. In the aim to sequester more carbon in the soil for alleviating the greenhouse effect it would be more efficient in the long-term to stimulate humification than to decrease litter decomposition.

The main part of soil organic matter is a complex assemblage of small organic molecules, collectively called humus or humic substances. The use of these terms, which do not rely on a clear chemical classification, has been considered as obsolete. Other studies showed that the classical notion of molecule is not convenient for humus, which escaped most attempts done over two centuries to resolve it in unit components, but still is chemically distinct from polysaccharides, lignins and proteins.

Most living things in soils, including plants, animals, bacteria, and fungi, transform nutrients and energy in organic matter and in turn are dependent on it for their requirements. Soils have organic compounds in varying degrees of decomposition, the rate of which is dependent on temperature, soil moisture, and aeration. Bacteria and fungi feed on raw organic matter, which are fed upon by protozoa, which in turn are fed upon by nematodes, annelids and arthropods, themselves able to consume and transform raw or humified organic matter. This has been called the soil food web, through which all organic matter is processed as in a digestive system. Organic matter holds soils open, allowing the infiltration of air and water, and may hold as much as twice its weight in water. Many soils, including desert and rocky-gravel soils, have little or no organic matter. Soils that are all organic matter, such as peat (histosol|), are infertile. In its earliest stage of decomposition, the original organic material is often called raw or fresh organic matter. The final stage of decomposition is called humus.

In grassland, much of the organic matter added to the soil is from the deep, fibrous, grass root systems. By contrast, tree leaves falling on the forest floor are the principal source of soil organic matter in the forest. Another difference is the frequent occurrence in the grasslands of fires that destroy large amounts of aboveground material but stimulate even greater contributions from roots. Also, the much greater acidity under any forests inhibits the action of certain soil organisms that otherwise would mix much of the surface litter into the mineral soil. As a result, the soils under grasslands generally develop a thicker A horizon with a deeper distribution of organic matter than in comparable soils under forests, which characteristically store most of their organic matter in the forest floor (O horizon) and thin A horizon.

== Horizons ==
A horizontal layer of the soil, whose physical features, composition and age are distinct from those above and beneath, is referred to as a soil horizon. The naming of a horizon is based on the type of material of which it is composed. Those materials reflect the duration of specific processes of soil formation. They are labelled using a shorthand notation of letters and numbers which describe the horizon in terms of its colour, size, texture, structure, consistency, root quantity, pH, voids, boundary characteristics and presence of nodules or concretions. No soil profile has all the major horizons. Some, called entisols, may have only one horizon or are currently considered as having no horizon, in particular incipient soils from unreclaimed mining waste deposits, moraines, volcanic cones sand dunes or alluvial terraces. Upper soil horizons may be lacking in truncated soils following wind or water ablation, with concomitant downslope burying of soil horizons, a natural process aggravated by agricultural practices such as tillage. The growth of trees is another source of disturbance, creating a micro-scale heterogeneity which is still visible in soil horizons once trees have died. By passing from a horizon to another, from the top to the bottom of the soil profile, one goes back in time, with past events registered in soil horizons like in sediment layers. Sampling pollen, testate amoebae and plant remains in soil horizons may help to reveal environmental changes (e.g. climate change, land use change) which occurred in the course of soil formation. Soil horizons can be dated by several methods such as radiocarbon, using pieces of charcoal provided they are of enough size to escape pedoturbation by earthworm activity and other mechanical disturbances. Fossil soil horizons from paleosols can be found within sedimentary rock sequences, allowing the study of past environments.

The exposure of parent material to favourable conditions produces mineral soils that are marginally suitable for plant growth, as is the case in eroded soils. The growth of vegetation results in the production of organic residues which fall on the ground as litter for plant aerial parts (leaf litter) or are directly produced belowground for subterranean plant organs (root litter), and then release dissolved organic matter. The remaining surficial organic layer, called the O horizon, produces a more active soil due to the effect of the organisms that live within it. Organisms colonise and break down organic materials, making available nutrients upon which other plants and animals can live. After sufficient time, humus moves downward (leaching, eluviation) and is deposited (illuviation) in a distinctive organic-mineral surface layer called the A horizon, in which organic matter is mixed with mineral matter through the activity of burrowing animals, a process called bioturbation. This natural process does not go to completion in the presence of conditions detrimental to soil life such as strong acidity, cold climate or pollution, stemming in the accumulation of undecomposed organic matter within a single organic horizon overlying the mineral soil and in the juxtaposition of humified organic matter and mineral particles, without intimate mixing, in the underlying mineral horizons.

== Classification ==
One of the first soil classification systems was developed by the Russian scientist Vasily Dokuchaev around 1880. It was modified a number of times by American and European researchers and was developed into the system commonly used until the 1960s. It was based on the idea that soils have a particular morphology based on the materials and factors that form them. In the 1960s, a different classification system began to emerge which focused on soil morphology instead of parental materials and soil-forming factors. Since then, it has undergone further modifications. The World Reference Base for Soil Resources aims to establish an international reference base for soil classification.

In the United States, the system of Soil Taxonomy is used. This system was established by the United States Department of Agriculture: Natural Resource Conversation Service and is currently on its second edition, released in 1999 by the Soil Survey Staff.

== Uses ==
Soil is used in agriculture, where it serves as the anchor and primary nutrient base for plants. The types of soil and available moisture determine the species of plants that can be cultivated. Agricultural soil science was the primeval domain of soil knowledge, long time before the advent of pedology in the 19th century. However, as demonstrated by aeroponics, aquaponics and hydroponics, soil material is not an absolute essential for agriculture, and soilless cropping systems have been claimed as the future of agriculture for an endless growing mankind.

Soil material is also a critical component in mining, construction and landscape development (also called landscape architecture) industries. Soil serves as a foundation for most construction projects. The movement of massive volumes of soil can be involved in surface mining, road building and dam construction. Earth sheltering is the architectural practice of using soil for external thermal mass against building walls. Many building materials are soil based. Loss of soil through urbanization is growing at a high rate in many areas and can be critical for the maintenance of subsistence agriculture.

Soil resources are critical to the environment, as well as to food and fibre production, producing 98.8% of food consumed by humans. Soil provides minerals and water to plants according to several processes involved in plant nutrition. Soil absorbs rainwater and releases it later, thus preventing floods and drought, flood regulation being one of the major ecosystem services provided by soil. Soil cleans water as it percolates through it.

Soil is the main or the sole habitat for many soil organisms: the major part of known and unknown biodiversity is in the soil, in the form of earthworms, woodlice, millipedes, centipedes, snails, slugs, mites, springtails, enchytraeids, nematodes, protists, bacteria, archaea, fungi and algae; and most organisms living above ground have part of them (plants) or spend part of their life cycle (e.g. insects) below-ground. Above-ground and below-ground biodiversities are tightly interconnected, making soil protection of paramount importance for any restoration or conservation plan.

The biological component of soil is an extremely important carbon sink since about 57% of the biotic content is carbon. Even in deserts, cyanobacteria, lichens and mosses form biological soil crusts which capture and sequester a significant amount of carbon by photosynthesis. Intensive farming and grazing methods have degraded soils and released much of this sequestered carbon to the atmosphere. Restoring the world's soils could offset the effect of increases in greenhouse gas emissions and global warming, while improving crop yields and reducing water needs.

Waste management often has a soil component. Septic drain fields treat septic tank effluent using aerobic soil processes. Land application of waste water relies on soil biology to aerobically treat BOD. Alternatively, landfills use soil for daily cover, isolating waste deposits from the atmosphere and preventing unpleasant smells. Composting is now widely used to treat aerobically solid domestic waste and dried effluents of settling basins. Although compost is not soil, biological processes taking place during composting are similar to those occurring during decomposition and humification of soil organic matter.

Organic soils, especially peat, serve as a significant fuel and horticultural resource. Peat soils are also commonly used for the sake of agriculture in Nordic countries, because peatland sites, when drained, provide fertile soils for food production. However, wide areas of peat production, such as rain-fed sphagnum bogs, also called mires, blanket bogs or raised bogs, are now threatened and protected because of their high patrimonial interest. As an example, Flow Country, covering 4,000 square kilometres of rolling expanse of blanket bogs in Scotland, is now recognized as a UNESCO World Heritage Site. Under present-day global warming peat soils are thought to be involved in a self-reinforcing (positive feedback) process of increased emission of greenhouse gases (methane and carbon dioxide) and increased temperature, a contention which is still under debate when replaced at field scale and including stimulated plant growth.

Geophagy is the practice of eating soil-like substances. Both animals and humans occasionally consume soil for medicinal, recreational, or religious purposes. It has been shown that some monkeys consume soil, together with their preferred food (tree foliage and fruits), in order to alleviate tannin toxicity.

Soils filter and purify water and affect its chemistry. Rain water and pooled water from ponds, lakes and rivers percolate through the soil horizons and the upper rock strata, thus becoming groundwater. Pests (viruses) and pollutants, such as persistent organic pollutants (chlorinated pesticides, polychlorinated biphenyls), oils (hydrocarbons), heavy metals (lead, zinc, cadmium), and excess nutrients (nitrates, sulfates, phosphates) are filtered out by the soil. Soil organisms metabolise or immobilise pollutants in their biomass and necromass (dead biomass), thereby incorporating them into stable humus. The physical integrity of soil is also a prerequisite for avoiding landslides in rugged landscapes.

== Degradation ==
Land degradation is a human-induced or natural process which impairs the capacity of land to function. Soil degradation involves acidification, contamination, desertification, erosion or salination.

=== Acidification ===
Soil acidification is beneficial in the case of alkaline soils, but it degrades land when it lowers crop productivity, soil biological activity and increases soil vulnerability to contamination and erosion. Soils are initially acid and remain such when their parent materials are low in basic cations (calcium, magnesium, potassium and sodium). On parent materials richer in weatherable minerals acidification occurs when basic cations are leached from the soil profile by rainfall or exported by the harvesting of forest or agricultural crops. Soil acidification is accelerated by the use of acid-forming nitrogenous fertilizers and by the effects of acid precipitation. Deforestation is another cause of soil acidification, mediated by increased leaching of soil nutrients in the absence of tree canopies.

=== Contamination ===
Soil contamination at low levels is often within a soil's capacity to treat and assimilate waste material. Soil biota can treat waste by transforming it, mainly through microbial enzymatic activity. Soil organic matter and soil clay minerals can adsorb the waste material and decrease its toxicity, although when in colloidal form they may transport the adsorbed contaminants to subsurface environments. Many waste treatment processes rely on this natural bioremediation capacity. Exceeding treatment capacity can damage soil biota and limit soil function. Derelict soils occur where industrial contamination or other development activity damages the soil to such a degree that the land cannot be used safely or productively, although some ecosystem services (e.g. decomposition) could still be provided by some derelict soils. Remediation of derelict soil uses principles of geology, physics, chemistry and biology to degrade, attenuate, isolate or remove soil contaminants to restore soil functions and values. Techniques include leaching, air sparging, soil conditioners, phytoremediation, bioremediation and Monitored Natural Attenuation. An example of diffuse pollution with contaminants is copper accumulation in vineyards and orchards to which fungicides are repeatedly applied, even in organic farming.

Microfibres from synthetic textiles are another type of plastic soil contamination. 100% of agricultural soil samples from southwestern China contain plastic particles, 92% of which are microfibres. Sources of microfibres likely include string or twine, as well as irrigation water in which clothes have been washed.

The application of biosolids from sewage sludge and compost can introduce microplastics to soils. This adds to the burden of microplastics from other sources (e.g. the atmosphere). Approximately half the sewage sludge in Europe and North America is applied to agricultural land. In Europe it has been estimated that for every million inhabitants 113 to 770 tonnes of microplastics are added to agricultural soils each year.

=== Desertification ===
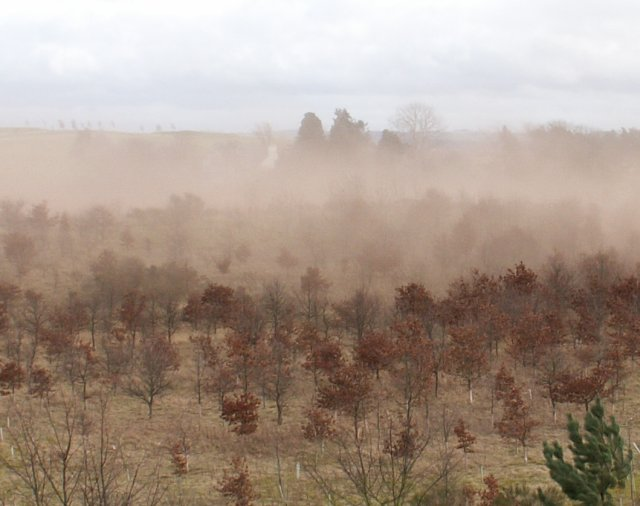
Desertification

Desertification, an environmental process of ecosystem degradation in arid and semi-arid regions, is often caused by badly adapted human activities such as overgrazing or excess harvesting of firewood. It is a common misconception that drought causes desertification. While droughts are common in arid and semiarid lands, well-managed lands can recover from drought when the rains return. Soil management tools include maintaining soil nutrient and organic matter levels, reduced tillage and increased plant cover. These practices help to control erosion and maintain productivity during periods when moisture is available. Continued land abuse during droughts, however, increases land degradation. Increased population and livestock pressure on marginal lands accelerates desertification. It is now questioned whether present-day climate warming will favour or disfavour desertification, with contradictory reports about predicted rainfall trends associated with increased temperature, and strong discrepancies among regions, even in the same country.

=== Erosion ===
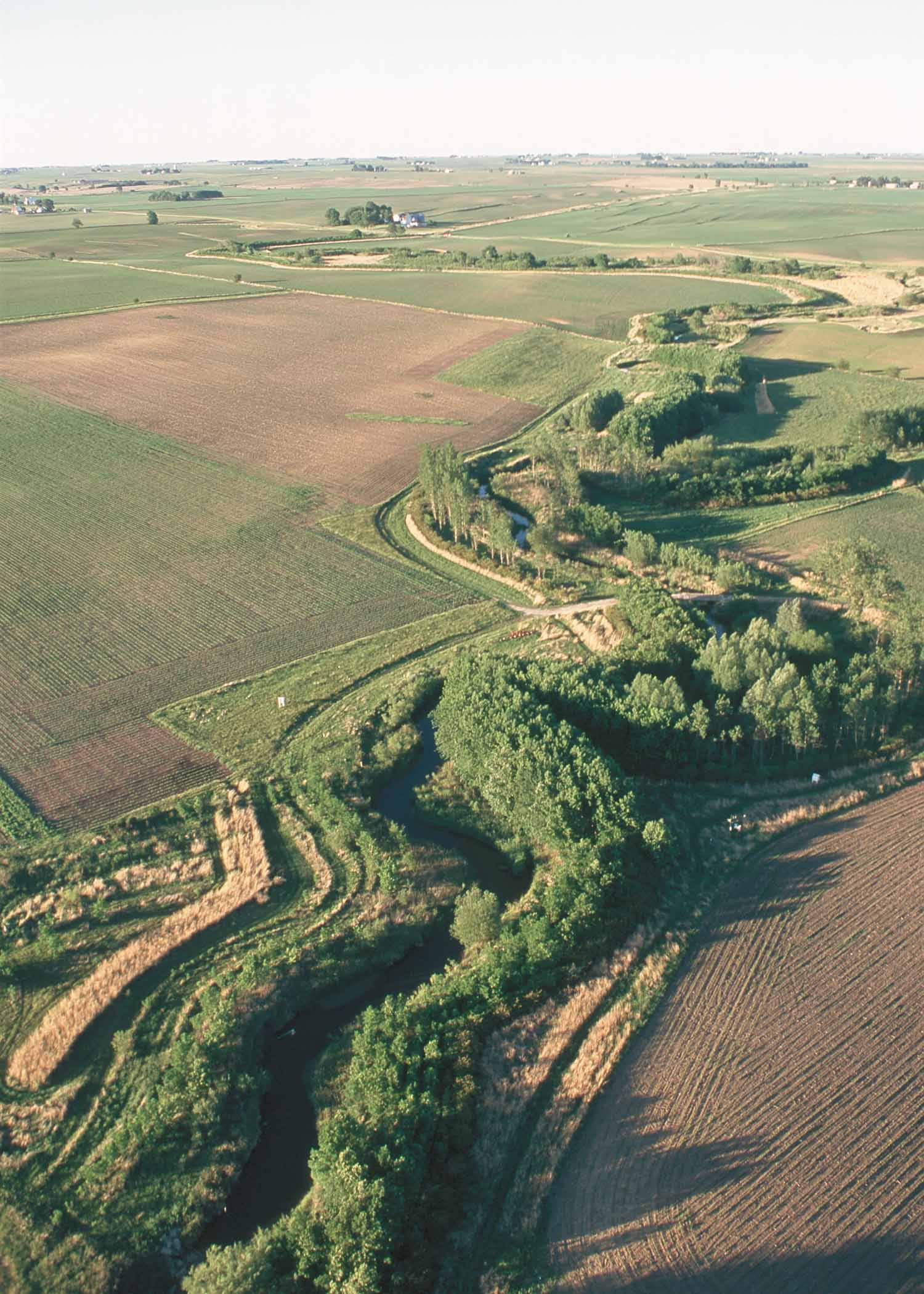
Erosion control

Erosion of soil is caused by water, wind, ice, and movement in response to gravity. More than one kind of erosion can occur simultaneously. Erosion is distinguished from weathering, since erosion also transports eroded soil away from its place of origin (soil in transit may be described as sediment). Erosion is an intrinsic natural process, but in many places it is greatly increased by human activity, especially unsuitable land use practices. These include agricultural activities which leave the soil bare during times of heavy rain or strong winds, overgrazing, deforestation, and improper construction activity. Improved management can limit erosion. Soil conservation techniques which are employed include changes of land use (such as replacing erosion-prone crops with grass or other soil-binding plants), changes to the timing or type of agricultural operations, terrace building, use of erosion-suppressing cover materials (including cover crops and other plants), limiting disturbance during construction, and avoiding construction during erosion-prone periods and in erosion-prone places such as steep slopes. Historically, one of the best examples of large-scale soil erosion due to unsuitable land-use practices is wind erosion (the so-called dust bowl) which ruined American and Canadian prairies during the 1930s, when immigrant farmers, encouraged by the federal government of both countries, settled and converted the original shortgrass prairie to agricultural crops and cattle ranching.

A serious and long-running water erosion problem occurs in China, on the middle reaches of the Yellow River and the upper reaches of the Yangtze River. From the Yellow River, over 1.6 billion tons of sediment flow each year into the ocean. The sediment originates primarily from water erosion (gully erosion) in the Loess Plateau region of northwest China.

Soil piping is a particular form of soil erosion that occurs below the soil surface. It causes levee and dam failure, as well as sink hole formation. Turbulent flow removes soil starting at the mouth of the seep flow and the subsoil erosion advances up-gradient. The term sand boil is used to describe the appearance of the discharging end of an active soil pipe.

=== Salination ===
Soil salination is the accumulation of free salts to such an extent that it leads to degradation of the agricultural value of soils and vegetation. Consequences include corrosion damage, reduced plant growth, erosion due to loss of plant cover and soil structure, and water quality problems due to sedimentation. Salination occurs due to a combination of natural and human-caused processes. Arid conditions favour salt accumulation. This is especially apparent when soil parent material is saline. Irrigation of arid lands is especially problematic. All irrigation water has some level of salinity. Irrigation, especially when it involves leakage from canals and overirrigation in the field, often raises the underlying water table. Rapid salination occurs when the land surface is within the capillary fringe of saline groundwater. Soil salinity control involves watertable control and flushing with higher levels of applied water in combination with tile drainage or another form of subsurface drainage.

== Reclamation ==
Soils which contain high levels of particular clays with high swelling properties, such as smectites, are often very fertile. For example, the smectite-rich paddy soils of Thailand's Central Plains are among the most productive in the world. However, the overuse of mineral nitrogen fertilizers and pesticides in irrigated intensive rice production has endangered these soils, forcing farmers to implement integrated practices based on Cost Reduction Operating Principles.

Many farmers in tropical areas, however, struggle to retain organic matter and clay in the soils they work. For example, productivity has declined and soil erosion has increased in the low-clay soils of northern Thailand, following the abandonment of shifting cultivation for a more permanent land use. Farmers initially responded by adding organic matter and clay from termite mound material, but this was unsustainable in the long-term because of rarefaction of termite mounds. Scientists experimented with adding bentonite, one of the smectite family of clays, to the soil. In field trials, conducted by scientists from the International Water Management Institute (IWMI) in cooperation with Khon Kaen University and local farmers, this had the effect of helping retain water and nutrients. Supplementing the farmer's usual practice with a single application of 200 kilograms per rai (1,300 kg/ha; 1,100 lb/acre) of bentonite resulted in an average yield increase of 73%. Other studies showed that applying bentonite to degraded sandy soils reduced the risk of crop failure during drought years.

In 2008, three years after the initial trials, IWMI scientists conducted a survey among 250 farmers in northeast Thailand, half of whom had applied bentonite to their fields. The average improvement for those using the clay addition was 18% higher than for non-clay users. Using the clay had enabled some farmers to switch to growing vegetables, which need more fertile soil. This helped to increase their income. The researchers estimated that 200 farmers in northeast Thailand and 400 in Cambodia had adopted the use of clays, and that a further 20,000 farmers were introduced to the new technique.

If the soil is too high in clay or salts (e.g. saline sodic soil), adding gypsum, washed river sand and organic matter (e.g.municipal solid waste) will balance the composition.

Adding organic matter, like ramial chipped wood or compost, to soil which is depleted in nutrients and too high in sand will boost its quality and improve production.

Special mention must be made of the use of charcoal, and more generally biochar to improve nutrient-poor tropical soils, a process based on the higher fertility of anthropogenic pre-Columbian Amazonian Dark Earths, also called Terra Preta de Índio, due to interesting physical and chemical properties of soil black carbon as a source of stable humus. However, the uncontrolled application of charred waste products of all kinds may endanger soil life and human health.

== History of studies and research ==
The history of the study of soil is intimately tied to humans' urgent need to provide food for themselves and forage for their animals. Throughout history, civilizations have prospered or declined as a function of the availability and productivity of their soils.

=== Studies of soil fertility ===
The Greek historian Xenophon (450–355 BCE) was the first to expound upon the merits of green-manuring crops: 'But then whatever weeds are upon the ground, being turned into earth, enrich the soil as much as dung.'

Columella's Of husbandry, c. 60 CE, advocated the use of lime and that clover and alfalfa (green manure) should be turned under, and was used by 15 generations (450 years) under the Roman Empire until its collapse. From the fall of Rome to the French Revolution, knowledge of soil and agriculture was passed on from parent to child and as a result, crop yields were low. During the European Middle Ages, Yahya Ibn al-'Awwam's handbook, with its emphasis on irrigation, guided the people of North Africa, Spain and the Middle East; a translation of this work was finally carried to the southwest of the United States when under Spanish influence. Olivier de Serres, considered the father of French agronomy, was the first to suggest the abandonment of fallowing and its replacement by hay meadows within crop rotations. He also highlighted the importance of soil (the French terroir) in the management of vineyards. His famous book Le Théâtre d'Agriculture et mesnage des champs contributed to the rise of modern, sustainable agriculture and to the collapse of old agricultural practices such as soil amendment for crops by the lifting of forest litter and assarting, which ruined the soils of western Europe during the Middle Ages and even later on according to regions.

Experiments into what made plants grow first led to the idea that the ash left behind when plant matter was burned was the essential element, but the role of nitrogen was overlooked, which is not left on the ground after combustion, a belief which prevailed until the 19th century. In about 1635, the Flemish chemist Jan Baptist van Helmont thought he had proved water to be the essential element from his famous five years' experiment with a willow tree grown with only the addition of rainwater. His conclusion came from the fact that the increase in the plant's weight had apparently been produced only by the addition of water, with no reduction in the soil's weight. John Woodward (d. 1728) experimented with various types of water ranging from clean to muddy and found muddy water the best, and so he concluded that earthy matter was the essential element. Others concluded it was humus in the soil that passed some essence to the growing plant. Still others held that the vital growth principal was something passed from dead plants or animals to the new plants. At the start of the 18th century, Jethro Tull demonstrated that it was beneficial to cultivate (stir) the soil, but his opinion that the stirring made the fine parts of soil available for plant absorption was erroneous.

As chemistry developed, it was applied to the investigation of soil fertility. The French chemist Antoine Lavoisier showed in about 1778 that plants and animals must combust oxygen internally to live. He was able to deduce that most of the 165-pound (75 kg) weight of Van Helmont's willow tree derived from air. It was the French agriculturalist Jean-Baptiste Boussingault who by means of experimentation obtained evidence showing that the main sources of carbon, hydrogen and oxygen for plants were air and water, while nitrogen was taken from soil. Justus von Liebig in his book Organic chemistry in its applications to agriculture and physiology (published 1840), asserted that the chemicals in plants must have come from the soil and air and that to maintain soil fertility, the used minerals must be replaced. Liebig nevertheless believed the nitrogen was supplied from the air. The enrichment of soil with guano by the Incas was rediscovered in 1802, by Alexander von Humboldt. This led to guano mining and that of Chilean nitrate and to its application to soil in the United States and Europe after 1840.

The work of Liebig was a revolution for agriculture, and so other investigators started experimentation based on it. In England John Bennet Lawes and Joseph Henry Gilbert worked in the Rothamsted Experimental Station, founded by the former, and (re)discovered that plants took nitrogen from the soil, and that salts needed to be in an available state to be absorbed by plants. Their investigations also produced the superphosphate, consisting in the acid treatment of phosphate rock. This led to the invention and use of salts of potassium (K) and nitrogen (N) as fertilizers. Ammonia generated by the production of coke was recovered and used as fertiliser. Finally, the chemical basis of nutrients delivered to the soil in manure was understood and in the mid-19th century chemical fertilisers were applied. However, the dynamic interaction of soil and its life forms was still not understood.

In 1856, J. Thomas Way discovered that ammonia contained in fertilisers was transformed into nitrate, and twenty years later Robert Warington proved that this transformation was done by living organisms. In 1890 Sergei Winogradsky announced he had found the bacteria responsible for this transformation.

It was known that certain legumes could take up nitrogen from the air and fix it to the soil but it took the development of bacteriology towards the end of the 19th century to lead to an understanding of the role played in nitrogen fixation by bacteria. The symbiosis of bacteria and leguminous roots, and the fixation of nitrogen by the bacteria, were simultaneously discovered by the German agronomist Hermann Hellriegel and the Dutch microbiologist Martinus Beijerinck.

Crop rotation, mechanisation, chemical and natural fertilisers led to a doubling of wheat yields in western Europe between 1800 and 1900.

=== Studies of soil formation ===
Scientists who studied soil in connection with agricultural practices considered it mainly a static substrate. However, the soil is the result of evolution from more ancient geological materials under the action of biotic and abiotic processes. After studies of soil improvement commenced, other researchers began to study soil genesis and, as a result, soil types and classifications.

In 1860, while in Mississippi, Eugene W. Hilgard (1833–1916) studied the relationship between rock material, climate, vegetation, and the type of soils that were developed. He realised that the soils were dynamic and considered the classification of soil types. His work was discontinued. At about the same time, Friedrich Albert Fallou described soil profiles and related soil characteristics to their formation as part of his professional work evaluating forest and farmland for the principality of Saxony. His 1857 book, Anfangsgründe der Bodenkunde (First principles of soil science), established modern soil science. Contemporary with Fallou's work, and driven by the same need to accurately assess land for equitable taxation, Vasily Dokuchaev led a team of soil scientists in Russia who conducted an extensive survey of soils, observing that similar basic rocks, climate and vegetation types lead to similar soil layering and types, and established the concepts for soil classifications. Due to language barriers, the work of this team was not communicated to Western Europe until 1914 through a publication in German by Konstantin Glinka, a member of the Russian team.

Curtis F. Marbut, influenced by the work of the Russian team, translated Glinka's publication into English, and, as he was placed in charge of the U.S. National Cooperative Soil Survey, applied it to a national soil classification system.

== See also ==
- Acid sulfate soil
- Agricultural science
- Agrophysics
- Crust
- Factors affecting permeability of soils
- Geomorphology
- Index of soil-related articles
- Lunar soil and martian soil
- Mycorrhizal fungi and soil carbon storage
- Red soil
- Shrink–swell capacity
- Soil biodiversity
- Soil liquefaction
- Soil moisture velocity equation
- Soil zoology
- Tillage erosion
- World Soil Museum

== Sources ==
This article incorporates text from a free content work. Licensed under Cc BY-SA 3.0 IGO (license statement/permission). Text taken from Drowning in Plastics – Marine Litter and Plastic Waste Vital Graphics, United Nations Environment Programme.

== Bibliography ==
- Donahue, Roy Luther; Miller, Raymond W.; Shickluna, John C. (1977). Soils: an introduction to soils and plant growth. Hoboken, New Jersey: Prentice-Hall. ISBN 978-0-13-821918-5.
- Stefferud, Alfred, ed. (1957). Soil: The Yearbook of Agriculture 1957. United States Department of Agriculture. OCLC 704186906.
  - Kellogg. "We seek; we learn". In Stefferud (1957).
  - Simonson. "What soils are". In Stefferud (1957).
  - Russell. "Physical properties". In Stefferud (1957).
  - Dean. "Plant nutrition and soil fertility". In Stefferud (1957).
  - Russel. "Boron and soil fertility". In Stefferud (1957).
- Soil-Net.com Archived 10 July 2008 at the Wayback Machine A free schools-age educational site teaching about soil and its importance.
- Adams, J.A. 1986. Dirt. College Station, Texas: Texas A&M University Press ISBN 0-89096-301-0
- Certini, G., Scalenghe, R. 2006. Soils: Basic concepts and future challenges. Cambridge Univ Press, Cambridge.
- Montgomery, David R., Dirt: The Erosion of Civilizations (U of California Press, 2007), ISBN 978-0-520-25806-8
- Faulkner, Edward H. Plowman's Folly (New York, Grosset & Dunlap, 1943). ISBN 0-933280-51-3
- LandIS Free Soilscapes Viewer Free interactive viewer for the Soils of England and Wales
- Jenny, Hans. 1941. Factors of Soil Formation: A System of Quantitative Pedology
- Logan, W.B. Dirt: The ecstatic skin of the earth (1995). ISBN 1-57322-004-3
- Mann, Charles C. September 2008. " Our good earth" National Geographic Magazine
- Short video explaining soil basics
- The Soil Water Compendium (soil water content sensors explained)
- Global Soil Partnership
- FAO Soils Portal
- World Reference Base for Soil Resources
- ISRIC – World Soil Information (ISC World Data Centre for Soils)
- ISRIC -World Soil Library and Maps
- ISRIC - World Soil Museum (WSM virtual)
- ISRIC - Soil data hub
- Wossac the world soil survey archive and catalogue
- Canadian Society of Soil Science
- Soil Science Society of America
- USDA-NRCS Web Soil Survey
- European Soil Portal (wiki)
- National Soil Resources Institute UK
- Plant and Soil Sciences eLibrary
- Copies of the reference 'Soil: The Yearbook of Agriculture 1957' in multiple formats
