= Subirrigation =

Irrigation method

Subirrigation also known as seepage irrigation, is a method of irrigation where water is delivered to the plant root zone. The excess may be collected for reuse.

Subirrigation is used in growing field crops such as tomatoes, peppers, and sugar cane in areas with high water tables such as Florida and in commercial greenhouse operations.

Three basic types of subirrigation system are in general use for potted plants in greenhouses: ebb-and-flow (bench-mounted enclosures holding pots are filled and then drained); trough (water is flowed through bench-mounted, slightly sloping enclosures containing pots); and flooded floor (special sloped concrete flooring is flooded and drained).

Greenhouse subirrigation has been growing in popularity since the 1990s. Advantages are water and nutrient conservation, and labor-saving. The outfitting cost is relatively high. Potential problems, such as the possibility of increased presence of disease in recycle water, have only begun to be investigated.

One of the disadvantages of sub-irrigated closed systems, such like Earth Boxes and sub-irrigated planters, is that soluble salts cannot be flushed into the lower soil profile and build up over time.

== See also ==
- Tidal irrigation
- Wicking bed
