= Irrigation =

Agricultural artificial application of water to land

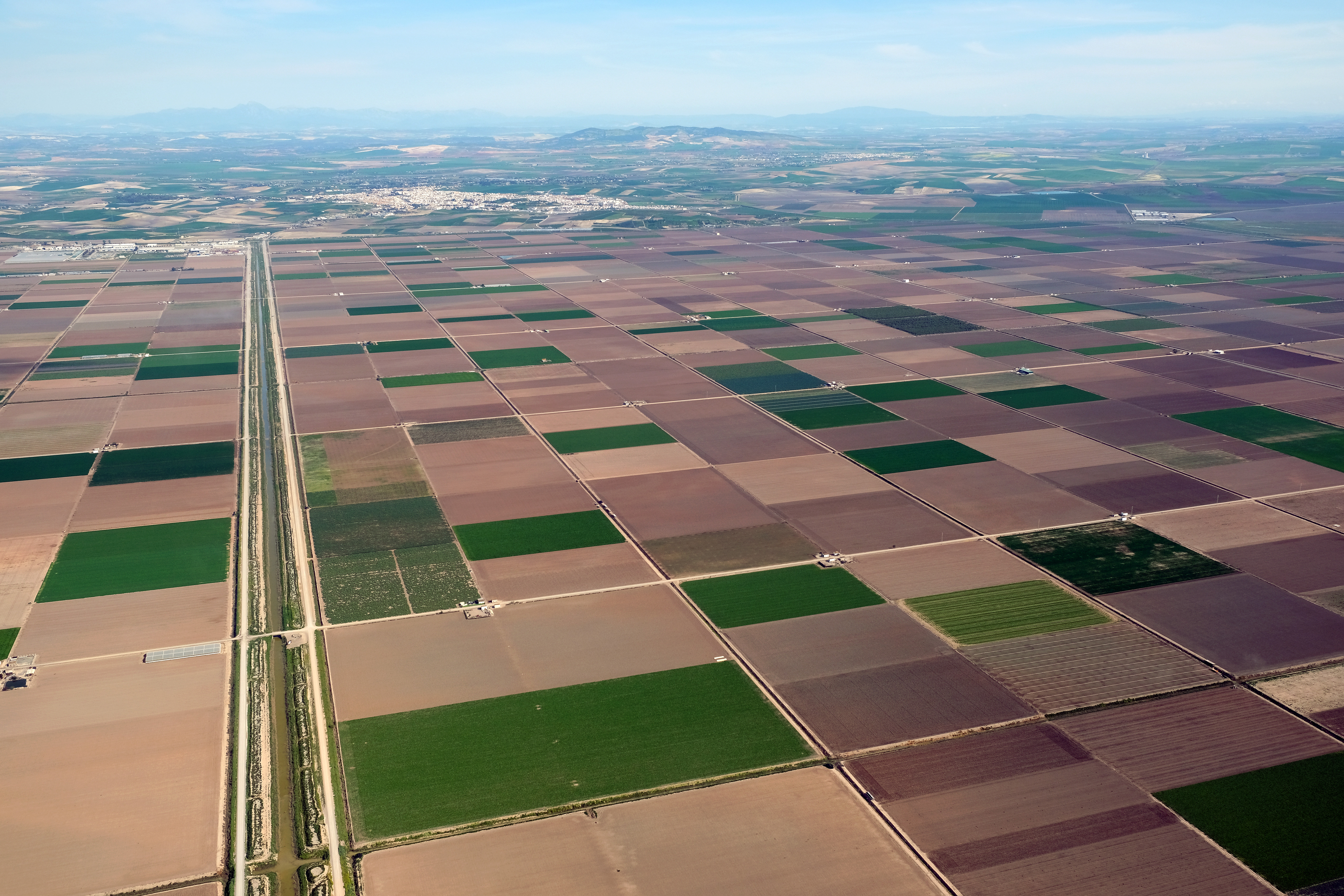
Irrigation of agricultural fields in Andalusia, Spain. Irrigation canal on the left.

Irrigation in agriculture is the practice of applying controlled amounts of water to land to help grow crops, landscape plants, and lawns. Irrigation has been a key aspect of agriculture for over 5,000 years and has been developed by many cultures worldwide. Irrigation helps to grow crops, maintain landscapes, and revegetate disturbed soils in dry areas and during times of below-average rainfall. In addition to these uses, irrigation is also employed to protect crops from frost, suppress weed growth in grain fields, and prevent soil consolidation. It is also used to cool livestock, reduce dust, dispose of sewage, and support mining operations. Drainage, which involves the removal of surface and sub-surface water from a given location, is often studied in conjunction with irrigation. Irrigation and drainage improvements are not necessarily mutually exclusive. Often both may be required together to assure sustained high-level production of crops. For a discussion of the role of drainage practices in agriculture.

Several irrigation methods differ in how water is supplied to plants. Surface irrigation, also known as gravity irrigation, is the oldest form of irrigation and has been in use for thousands of years. In sprinkler irrigation, water is piped to one or more central locations within the field and distributed by overhead high-pressure water devices. Micro-irrigation is a system that distributes water under low pressure through a piped network and applies it as a small discharge to each plant. Micro-irrigation uses less pressure and water flow than sprinkler irrigation. Drip irrigation delivers water directly to the root zone of plants. Subirrigation has been used in field crops in areas with high water tables for many years. It involves artificially raising the water table to moisten the soil below the root zone of plants.

Irrigation water can come from groundwater (extracted from springs or by using wells), from surface water (withdrawn from rivers, lakes or reservoirs) or from non-conventional sources like treated wastewater, desalinated water, drainage water, or fog collection. Irrigation can be supplementary to rainfall, which is common in many parts of the world as rainfed agriculture, or it can be full irrigation, where crops rarely rely on any contribution from rainfall. Full irrigation is less common and occurs only in arid landscapes with very low rainfall or when crops are grown in semi-arid areas outside the rainy season.

The environmental effects of irrigation relate to the changes in quantity and quality of soil and water as a result of irrigation and the subsequent effects on natural and social conditions in river basins and downstream of an irrigation scheme. The effects stem from altered hydrological conditions resulting from the installation and operation of the irrigation scheme. Amongst these problems is the depletion of underground aquifers through overdrafting. Soil can be over-irrigated due to poor distribution uniformity or management wastes water, chemicals, and may lead to water pollution. Over-irrigation can cause deep drainage from rising water tables, which can lead to irrigation salinity problems, requiring watertable control through some form of subsurface land drainage.

== Extent ==
Share of agricultural land which is irrigated (2021)

Area equipped For irrigation by region

The world’s total irrigated land area more than doubled between 1964 and 2023 and by 2023, 23% of all croplands were equipped for irrigation. In 2025, irrigated croplands produce 48% of all crops in value terms, indicating that irrigated land is 3.2 times more productive than rainfed land in value terms. On average, the yield of irrigated land is 76% higher than that of rain fed land.

The global land area equipped for irrigation reached 355 million ha in 2023, an increase of 23% from the 289 million ha of 2000 and more than twice the land area equipped for irrigation in the 1960s. The vast majority is located in Asia (71% in 2023), where irrigation was a key component of the green revolution; the Americas account for 16% and Europe for 8% of the world total. India (76 million ha) and China (75 million ha) have the largest equipped area for irrigation, far ahead of the United States of America (25 million ha). China and India also have the largest net gains in equipped area between 2000 and 2023 (+21 million ha for China and +15 million ha for India).

In 2000, the total fertile land was 2,788,000 km^{2} (689 million acres), and it was equipped with irrigation infrastructure worldwide. Roughly 68% of this area is in Asia, 17% in the Americas, 9% in Europe, 5% in Africa, and 1% in Oceania. The largest contiguous areas of high irrigation density are found in Northern and Eastern India and Pakistan along the Ganges and Indus rivers; in the Hai He, Huang He, and Yangtze basins in China; along the Nile river in Egypt and Sudan; and in the Mississippi-Missouri river basin, the Southern Great Plains, and in parts of California in the United States. Smaller irrigation areas are spread across almost all populated parts of the world.

By 2012, the area of irrigated land had increased to an estimated total of 3,242,917 km^{2} (801 million acres), which is nearly the size of India. The irrigation of 20% of farming land accounts for the production of 40% of food production.

=== Global overview ===
The scale of irrigation increased dramatically over the 20th century. In 1800, 8 million hectares globally were irrigated; in 1950, 94 million; and in 1990, 235 million. By 1990, 30% of the global food production came from irrigated land. Irrigation techniques across the globe include canals redirecting surface water, groundwater pumping, and diverting water from dams. National governments lead most irrigation schemes within their borders, but private investors and other nations, especially the Canada, China, and European countries like the United Kingdom, also fund and organize some schemes within other nations.

By 2021, the global land area equipped for irrigation reached 352 million ha, an increase of 22% from the 289 million ha in 2000 and more than twice the land area equipped for irrigation in the 1960s. The vast majority is located in Asia (70%), where irrigation was a key component of the green revolution; the Americas account for 16%, and Europe for 8% of the world total. India (76 million ha) and China (75 million ha) have the largest irrigated area, far ahead of the United States of America (27 million ha). China and India also had the largest net gains in equipped area between 2000 and 2020 (+21 million ha in China and +15 million ha in India). All regions saw increases in irrigated area, with Africa growing the fastest (+29%), followed by Asia (+25%), Oceania (+24%), the Americas (+19%), and Europe (+2%).

Irrigation enables the production of more crops, especially commodity crops in areas that otherwise could not support them. Countries frequently invested in irrigation to increase wheat, rice, or cotton production, often with the overarching goal of increasing self-sufficiency.

=== Example values for crops ===
Approximate values of seasonal crop water needs
Crop	Crop water needs mm / total growing period
Sugarcane	1500–2500
Banana	1200–2200
Citrus	900–1200
Potato	500–700
Tomato	400–800
Barley/oats/wheat	450–650
Cabbage	350–500
Onions	350–550
Pea	350–500

== Water sources ==
=== Groundwater and surface water ===
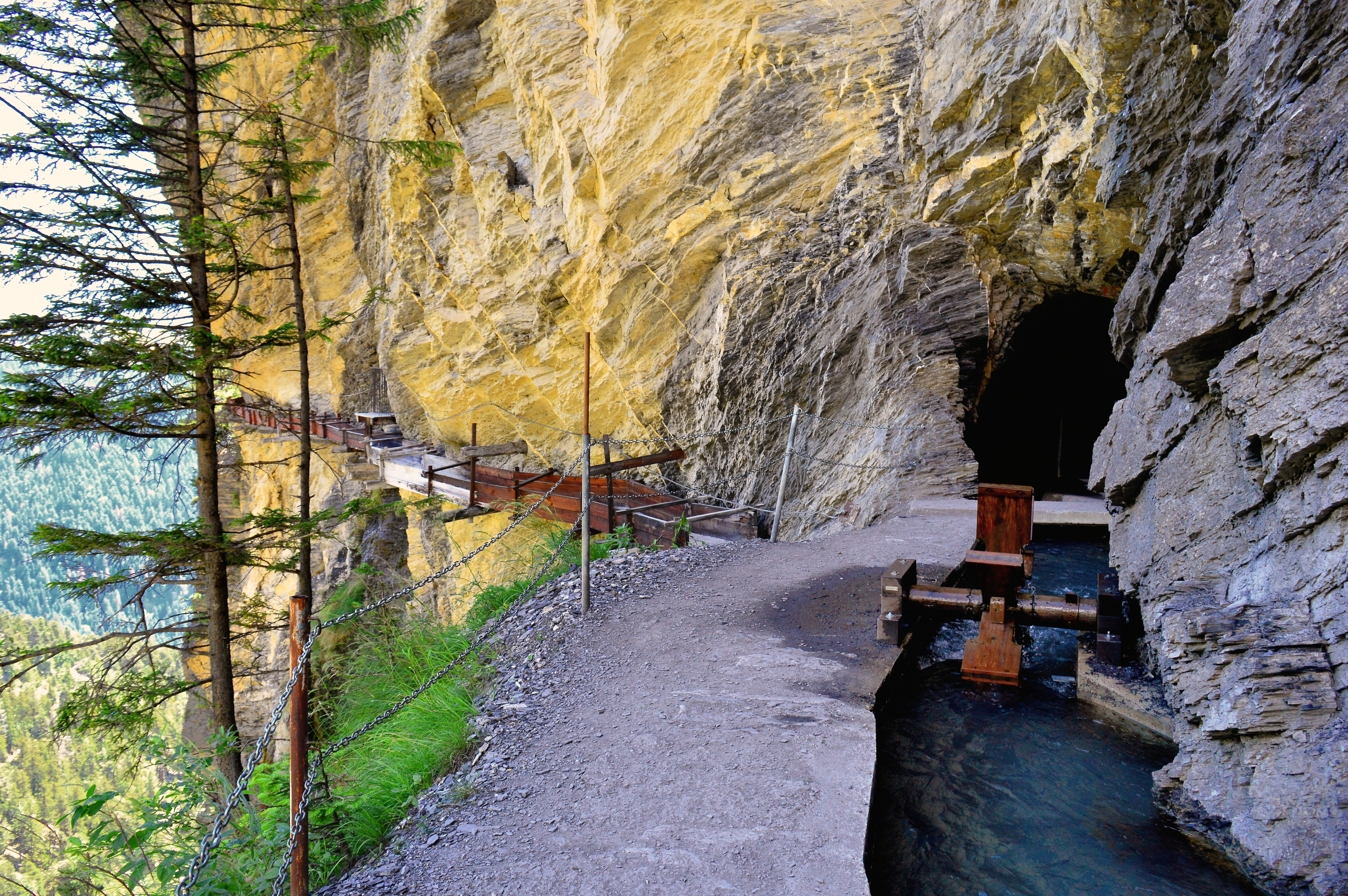
Traditional irrigation channel in Switzerland, collecting water from the high Alps

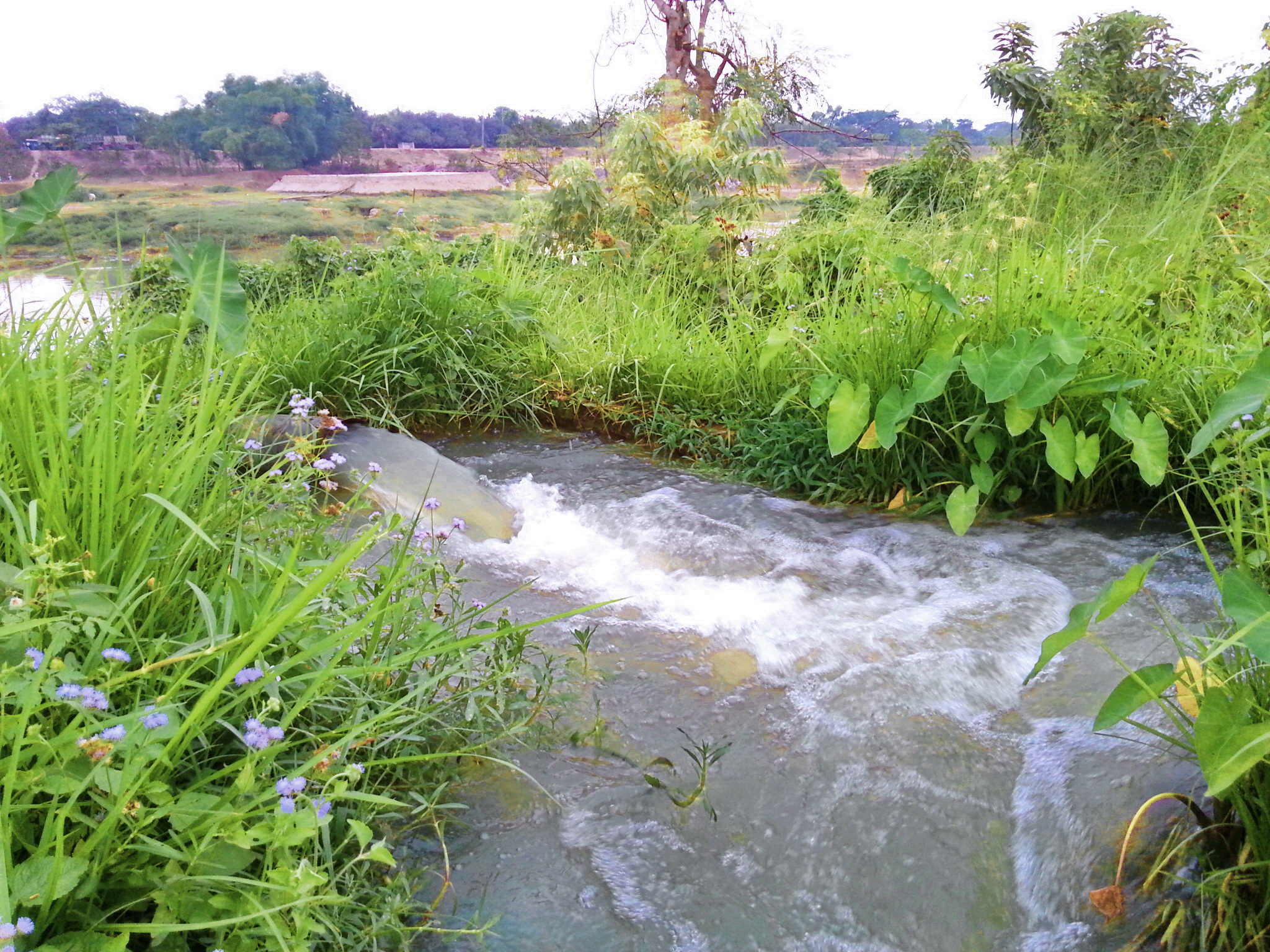
Irrigation is underway by pump-enabled extraction directly from the Gumti, seen in the background, in Comilla, Bangladesh.

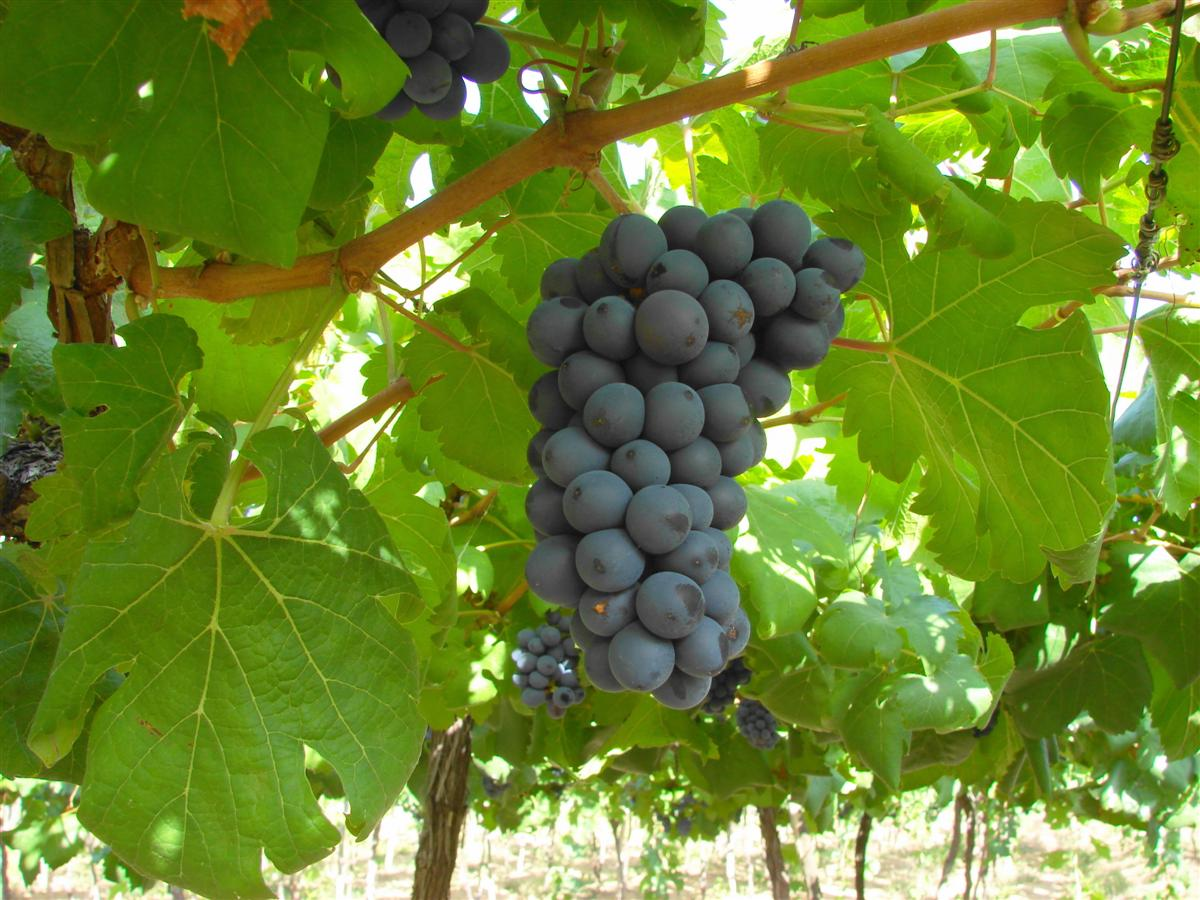
Grapes in Petrolina, Brazil only made possible in this semi arid area by drip irrigation

Irrigation water can come from groundwater (extracted from springs or by using wells), from surface water (withdrawn from rivers, lakes or reservoirs) or from non-conventional sources like treated wastewater, desalinated water, drainage water, or fog collection.

While floodwater harvesting is an accepted irrigation method, rainwater harvesting is usually not considered a form of irrigation. Rainwater harvesting is the collection of runoff water from roofs or unused land and its concentration.

=== Treated or untreated wastewater ===
Irrigation with recycled municipal wastewater can also serve to fertilize plants if it contains nutrients, such as nitrogen, phosphorus and potassium. There are benefits of using recycled water for irrigation, including the lower cost compared to some other sources and consistency of supply regardless of season, climatic conditions and associated water restrictions. When reclaimed water is used for irrigation in agriculture, the nutrient (nitrogen and phosphorus) content of the treated wastewater has the benefit of acting as a fertilizer. This can make the reuse of excreta contained in sewage attractive.

The irrigation water can be used in different ways on different crops, such as for food crops to be eaten raw or for crops which are intended for human consumption to be eaten raw or unprocessed. For processed food crops: crops which are intended for human consumption not to be eaten raw but after food processing (i.e. cooked, industrially processed). It can also be used on crops which are not intended for human consumption (e.g. pastures, forage, fiber, ornamental, seed, forest and turf crops).

In developing countries, agriculture is increasingly using untreated municipal wastewater for irrigation – often in an unsafe manner. Cities provide lucrative markets for fresh produce, so they are attractive to farmers. However, because agriculture has to compete for increasingly scarce water resources with industry and municipal users, there is often no alternative for farmers but to use water polluted with urban waste directly to water their crops.

There can be significant health hazards related to using untreated wastewater in agriculture. Municipal wastewater can contain a mixture of chemical and biological pollutants. In low-income countries, there are often high levels of pathogens from excreta. In emerging nations, where industrial development is outpacing environmental regulation, there are increasing risks from inorganic and organic chemicals. The World Health Organization developed guidelines for safe use of wastewater in 2006, advocating a 'multiple-barrier' approach wastewater use, for example by encouraging farmers to adopt various risk-reducing behaviors. These include ceasing irrigation a few days before harvesting to allow pathogens to die off in the sunlight; applying water carefully so it does not contaminate leaves likely to be eaten raw; cleaning vegetables with disinfectant; or allowing fecal sludge used in farming to dry before being used as a human manure.

Drawbacks or risks often mentioned include the content of potentially harmful substances such as bacteria, heavy metals, or organic pollutants (including pharmaceuticals, personal care products and pesticides). Irrigation with wastewater can have both positive and negative effects on soil and plants, depending on the composition of the wastewater and on the soil or plant characteristics.

=== Other sources ===
Irrigation water can also come from non-conventional sources like treated wastewater, desalinated water, drainage water, or fog collection.

In countries where humid air sweeps through at night, water can be obtained by condensation onto cold surfaces. This is practiced in the vineyards at Lanzarote using stones to condense water. Fog collectors are also made of canvas or foil sheets. Using condensate from air conditioning units as a water source is also becoming more popular in large urban areas.

As of November 2019, a Glasgow-based startup has helped a farmer in Scotland to establish edible salt marsh crops irrigated with seawater. An acre of previously marginal land has been put under cultivation to grow samphire, sea blite, and sea aster; these plants yield a higher profit than potatoes. The land is flood irrigated twice a day to simulate tidal flooding; the water is pumped from the sea using wind power. Additional benefits are soil remediation and carbon sequestration.

=== Competition for water resources ===
Until the 1960s, there were fewer than half as many people on the planet as there are in 2024. People were not as wealthy as today, consumed fewer calories and ate less meat, so less water was needed to produce their food. They required a third of the volume of water humans presently take from rivers. Today, the competition for water resources is much more intense, because there are now more than seven billion people on the planet, increasing the likelihood of overconsumption of food produced by water-thirsty animal agriculture and intensive farming practices. This creates increasing competition for water from industry, urbanisation, and biofuel crops. Farmers will have to strive to increase productivity to meet growing demands for food, while industry and cities find ways to use water more efficiently.

Successful agriculture depends on farmers having adequate access to water. However, water scarcity is already a critical constraint to farming in many parts of the world.

== Irrigation methods ==
There are several methods of irrigation. They vary in how the water is supplied to the plants. The goal is to apply the water to the plants as uniformly as possible, so that each plant has the amount of water it needs, neither too much nor too little. Irrigation can also be understood whether it is supplementary to rainfall, as happens in many parts of the world, or whether it is 'full irrigation, whereby crops rarely depend on any contribution from rainfall. Full irrigation is less common and occurs only in arid landscapes with very low rainfall or when crops are grown in semi-arid areas outside rainy seasons.

=== Surface irrigation ===
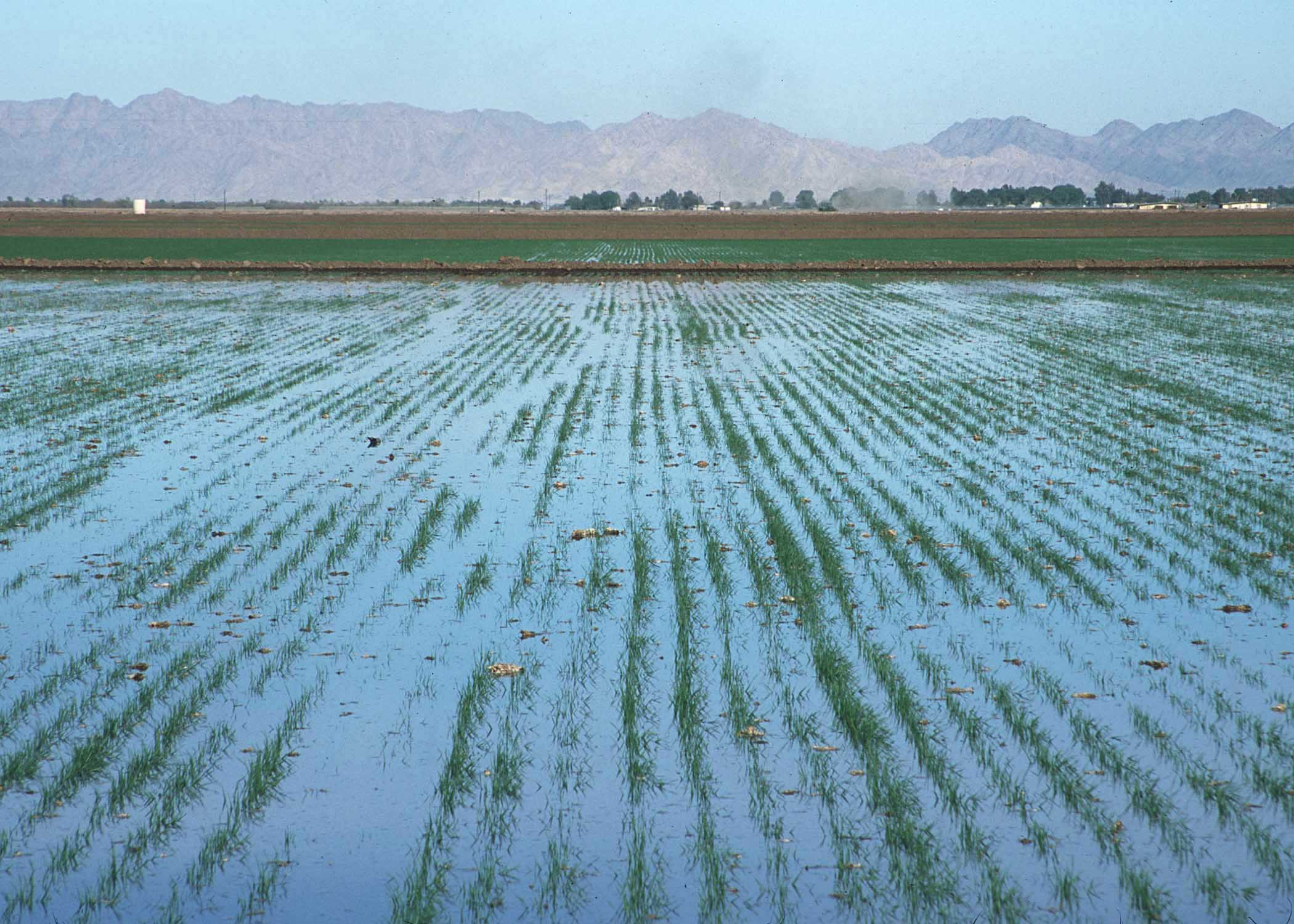
Basin flood irrigation of wheat

Surface irrigation, also known as gravity irrigation, is the oldest form of irrigation and has been in use for thousands of years. In surface (furrow, flood, or level basin) irrigation systems, water moves across the surface of agricultural lands to wet it and infiltrate into the soil. Water moves by following gravity or the slope of the land. Surface irrigation can be subdivided into furrow, border strip, or basin irrigation. It is often called flood irrigation when irrigation results in flooding or near-flooding of the cultivated land. Historically, surface irrigation has been the most common method for irrigating agricultural land in most parts of the world. The water application efficiency of surface irrigation is typically lower than that of other irrigation methods, due in part to limited control over applied depths. Surface irrigation involves significantly lower capital costs and energy requirements than pressurized irrigation systems. Hence, it is often the irrigation choice for developing nations, for low-value crops, and for large fields. Where water levels from the irrigation source permit, they are controlled by dikes (levees), usually plugged with soil. This is often seen in terraced rice fields (rice paddies), where the method is used to flood or control water levels in each distinct field. In some cases, the water is pumped or lifted by human or animal power to the level of the land.

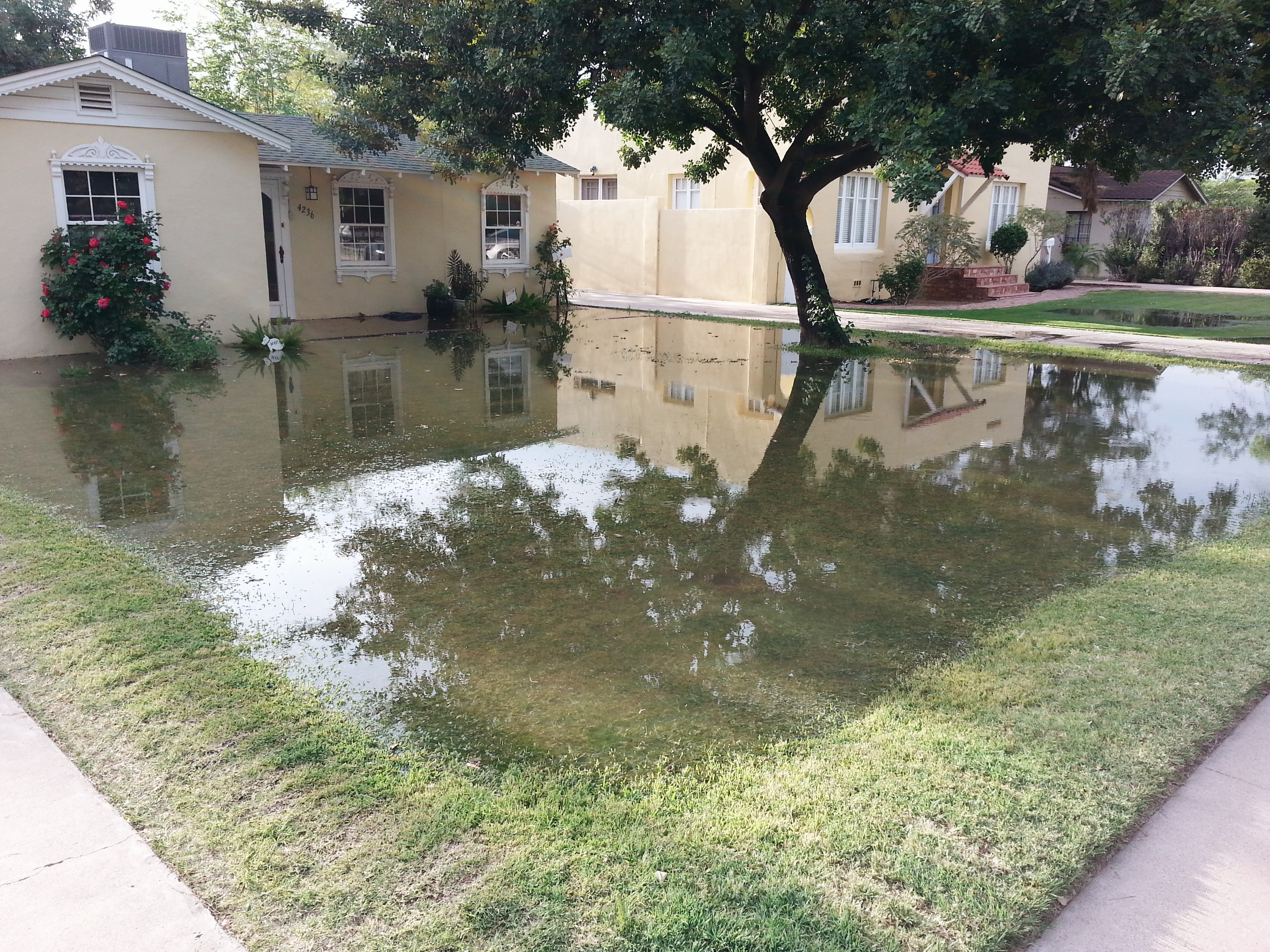
Residential flood irrigation in Phoenix, Arizona, US

Surface irrigation is even used to water urban gardens in certain areas, for example, in and around Phoenix, Arizona. The irrigated area is surrounded by a berm and the water is delivered according to a schedule set by a local irrigation district.

A special form of irrigation using surface water is spate irrigation, also called floodwater harvesting. In the event of a flood (spate), water is diverted into normally dry river beds (wadis) via a network of dams, gates, and channels and spread over large areas. The moisture stored in the soil will be used to grow crops thereafter. Spate irrigation areas are particularly located in semi-arid or arid mountainous regions.

=== Micro-irrigation ===
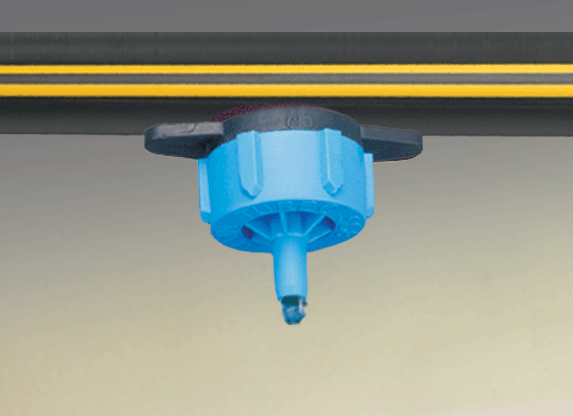
Drip irrigation – a dripper in action

Micro-irrigation, sometimes called localized irrigation, low volume irrigation, or trickle irrigation, is a system where water is distributed under low pressure through a piped network, in a pre-determined pattern, and applied as a small discharge to each plant or adjacent to it. Traditional drip irrigation uses individual emitters, subsurface drip irrigation (SDI), micro-spray or micro-sprinklers, and mini-bubbler irrigation, all of which belong to this category of irrigation methods.

==== Drip irrigation ====
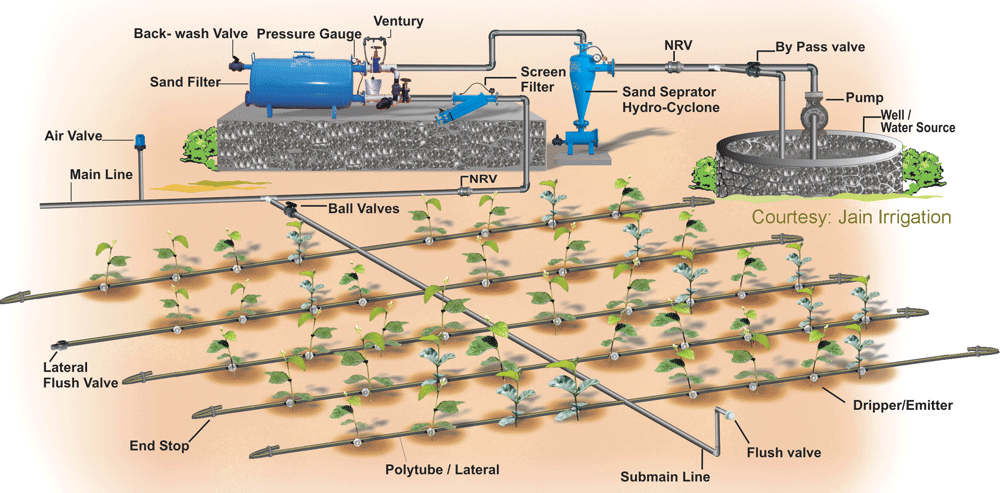
Drip irrigation layout and its parts

Drip irrigation, also known as microirrigation or trickle irrigation, functions as its name suggests. In this system, water is delivered at or near the root zone of plants, one drop at a time. This method can be the most water-efficient method of irrigation, if managed properly; evaporation and runoff are minimized. The field water efficiency of drip irrigation is typically in the range of 80 to 90% when managed correctly.

In modern agriculture, drip irrigation is often combined with plastic mulch, further reducing evaporation, and is also the means of delivery of fertilizer. The process is known as fertigation.

Deep percolation, where water moves below the root zone, can occur if a drip system is operated for too long or if the delivery rate is too high. Drip irrigation methods range from very high-tech and computerized to low-tech and labour-intensive. Lower water pressures are usually needed than for most other types of systems, except for low-energy center pivot systems and surface irrigation systems. The system can be designed for uniformity throughout a field or for precise water delivery to individual plants in a landscape containing a mix of plant species. Although it is difficult to regulate pressure on steep slopes, pressure-compensating emitters are available, so the field does not need to be level. High-tech solutions involve precisely calibrated emitters positioned along lines of tubing extending from a computerized set of valves.

=== Sprinkler irrigation ===
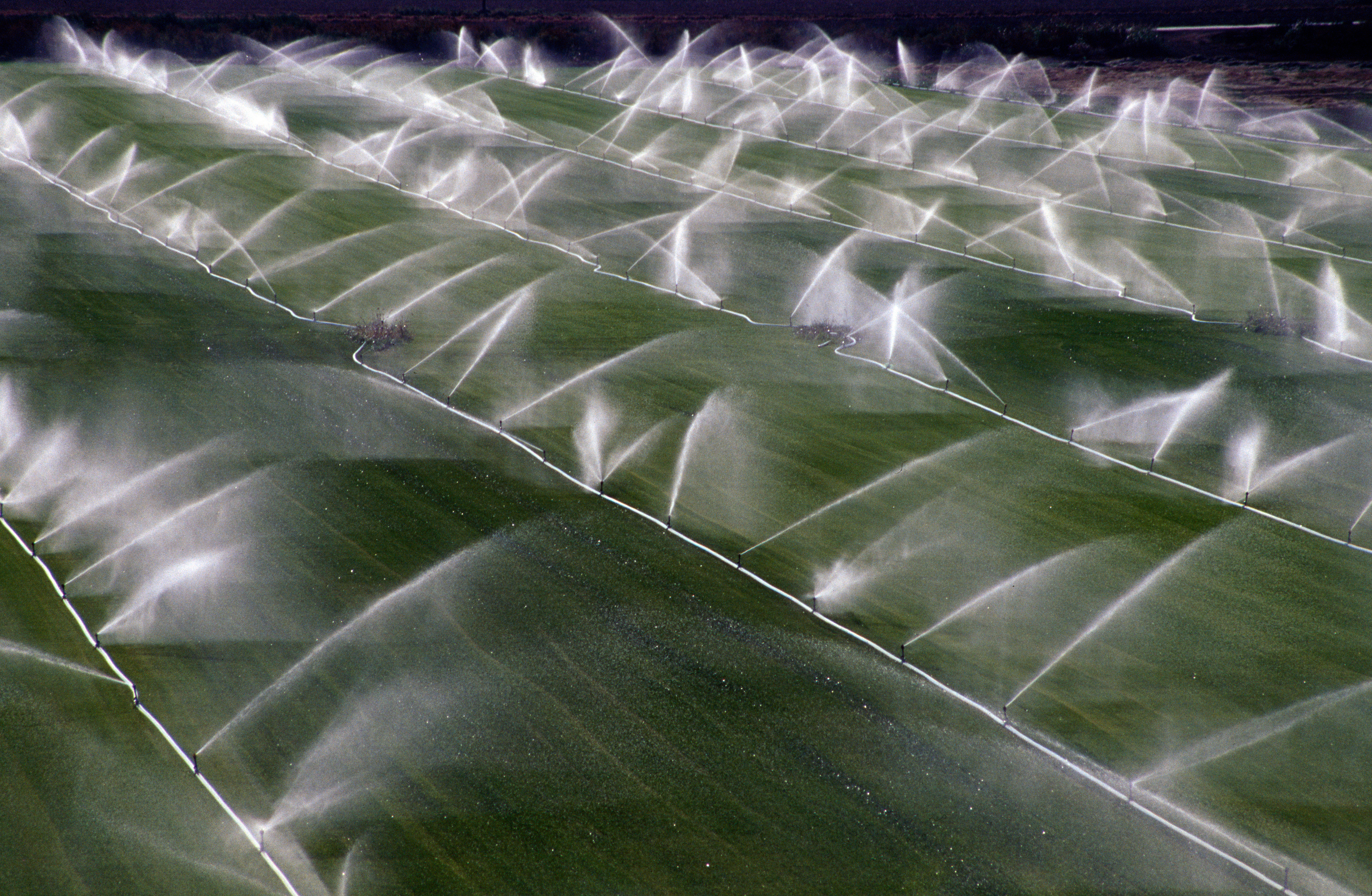
Crop sprinklers near Rio Vista, California, US

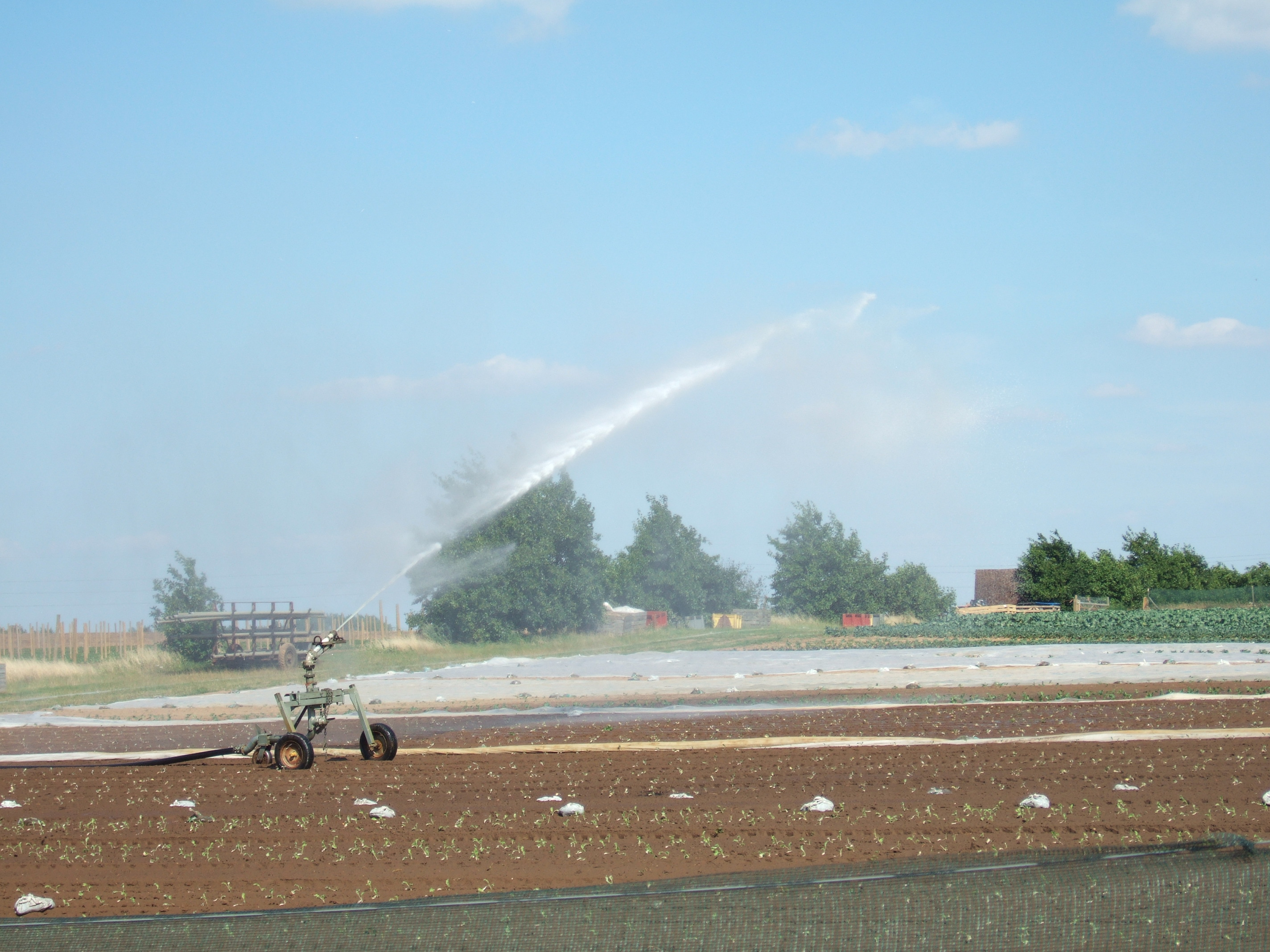
A traveling sprinkler at Millets Farm Centre, Oxfordshire, United Kingdom

In sprinkler or overhead irrigation, water is piped to one or more central locations within the field and distributed by overhead high-pressure sprinklers or guns. A system using sprinklers, sprays, or guns mounted overhead on permanently installed risers is often referred to as a solid-set irrigation system. Higher-pressure sprinklers that rotate are called rotors and are driven by a ball drive, gear drive, or impact mechanism. Rotors can be designed to rotate in a full or partial circle. Guns are similar to rotors, except that they generally operate at very high pressures of 275 to 900 kPa (39.9 to 130.5 psi) and flows of 3 to 76 L/s (50 to 1200 US gal/min), usually with nozzle diameters in the range of 10 to 50 mm (0.39 to 1.97 in). Guns are used not only for irrigation, but also for industrial applications such as dust suppression and logging.

Sprinklers can also be mounted on moving platforms connected to the water source by a hose. Automatically moving wheeled systems known as traveling sprinklers may irrigate areas such as small farms, sports fields, parks, pastures, and cemeteries unattended. Most of these use a length of polyethylene tubing wound on a steel drum. As the tubing is wound onto the drum, powered by irrigation water or a small gas engine, the sprinkler is pulled across the field. When the sprinkler returns to the reel, the system shuts off. This type of system is known to most people as a "water reel" travelling irrigation sprinkler, and it is used extensively for dust suppression, irrigation, and the land application of wastewater.

Other travellers use a flat rubber hose dragged along behind them, while a cable pulls the sprinkler platform.

==== Center pivot ====
Center pivot irrigation is a form of sprinkler irrigation utilising several segments of pipe (usually galvanized steel or aluminium) joined and supported by trusses, mounted on wheeled towers with sprinklers positioned along its length. The system moves in a circular pattern and is fed with water from the pivot point at the center of the arc. These systems are found and used in all parts of the world and allow irrigation of all types of terrain. Newer systems have drop sprinkler heads.

As of 2017, most center pivot systems have drops hanging from a U-shaped pipe attached at the top of the pipe with sprinkler heads that are positioned a few feet (at most) above the crop, thus limiting evaporative losses. Drops can also be used with drag hoses or bubblers that deposit the water directly on the ground between crops. Crops are often planted in a circle to conform to the center pivot. This type of system is known as LEPA (Low Energy Precision Application). Originally, most center pivots were water-powered. These were replaced by hydraulic systems (T-L Irrigation) and electric-motor-driven systems (Reinke, Valley, Zimmatic). Many modern pivots feature GPS devices.

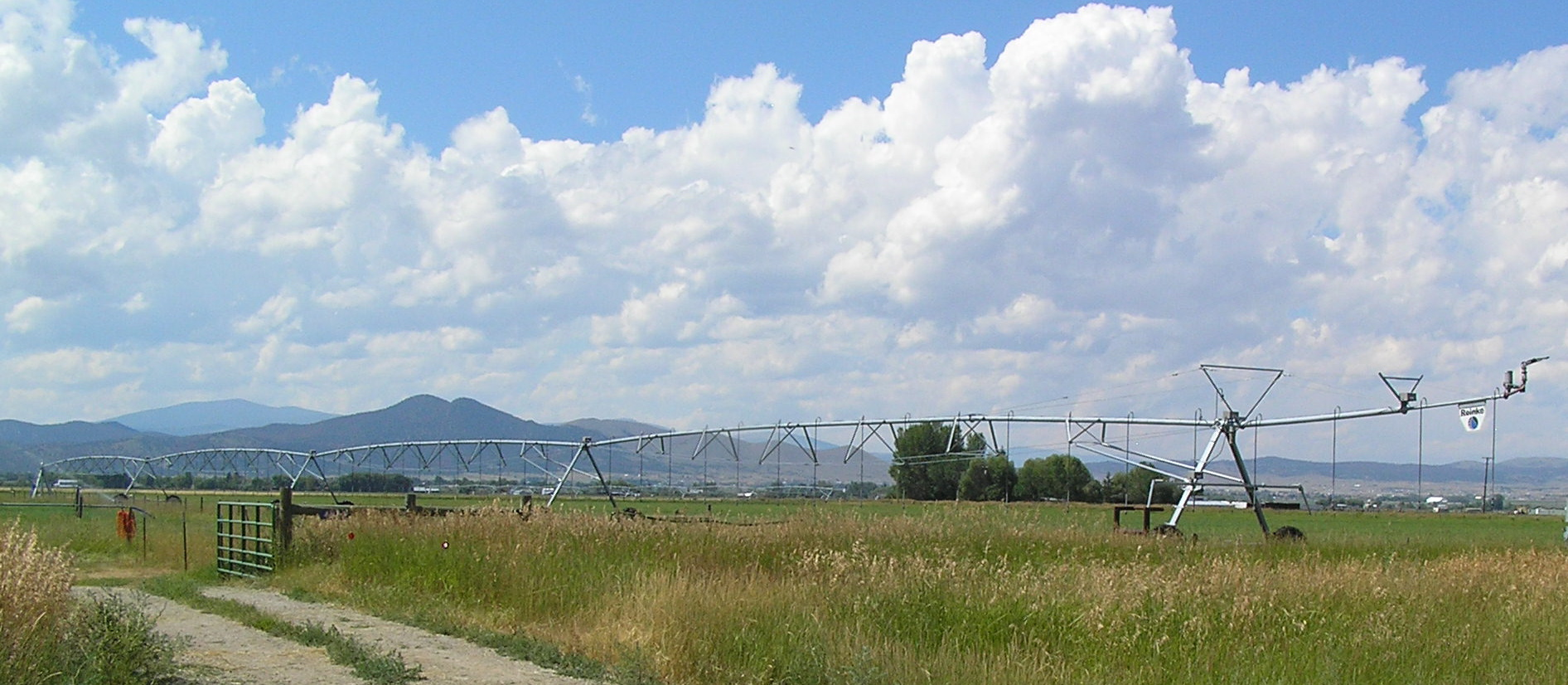
A small center pivot system from beginning to end

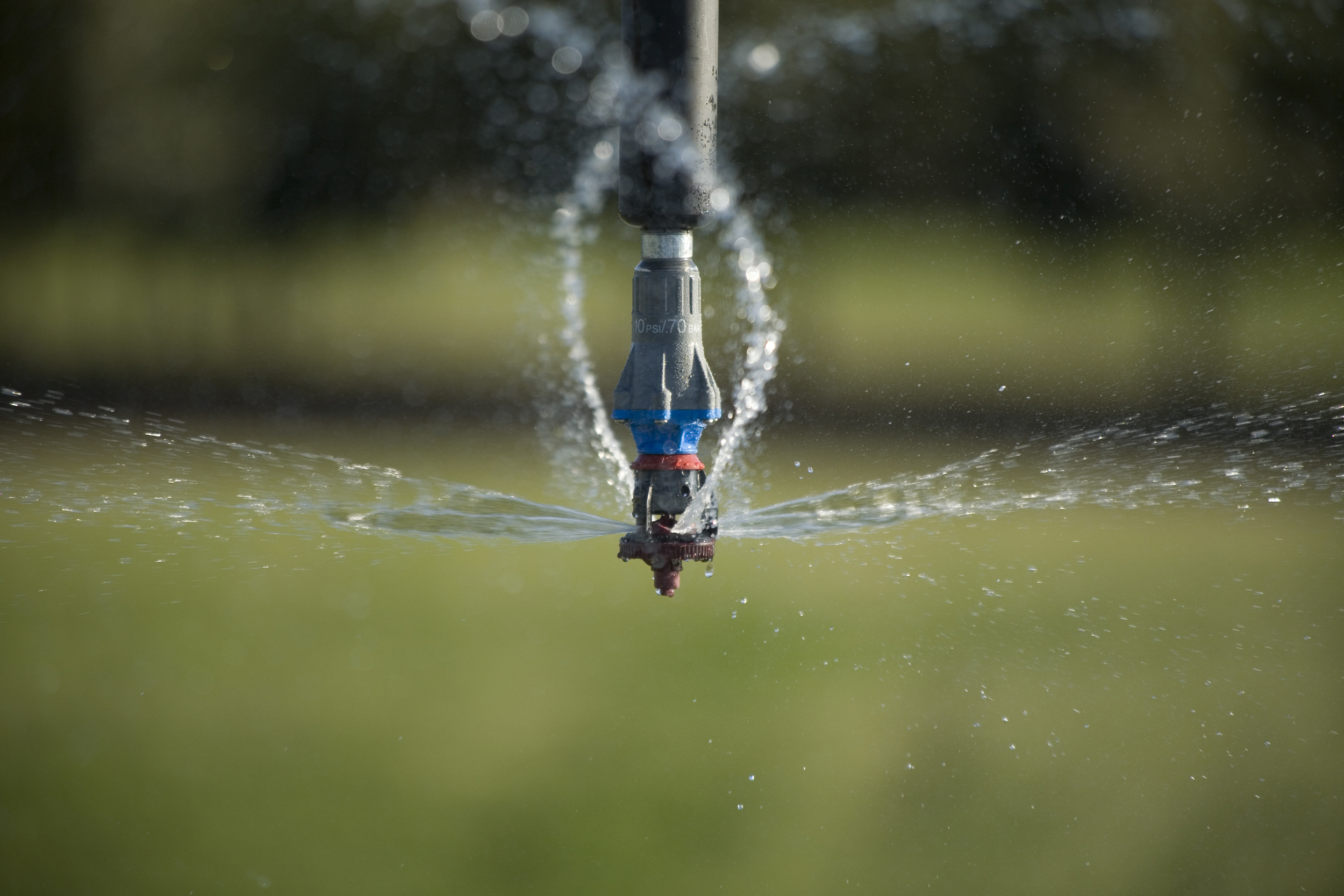
Rotator style pivot applicator sprinkler

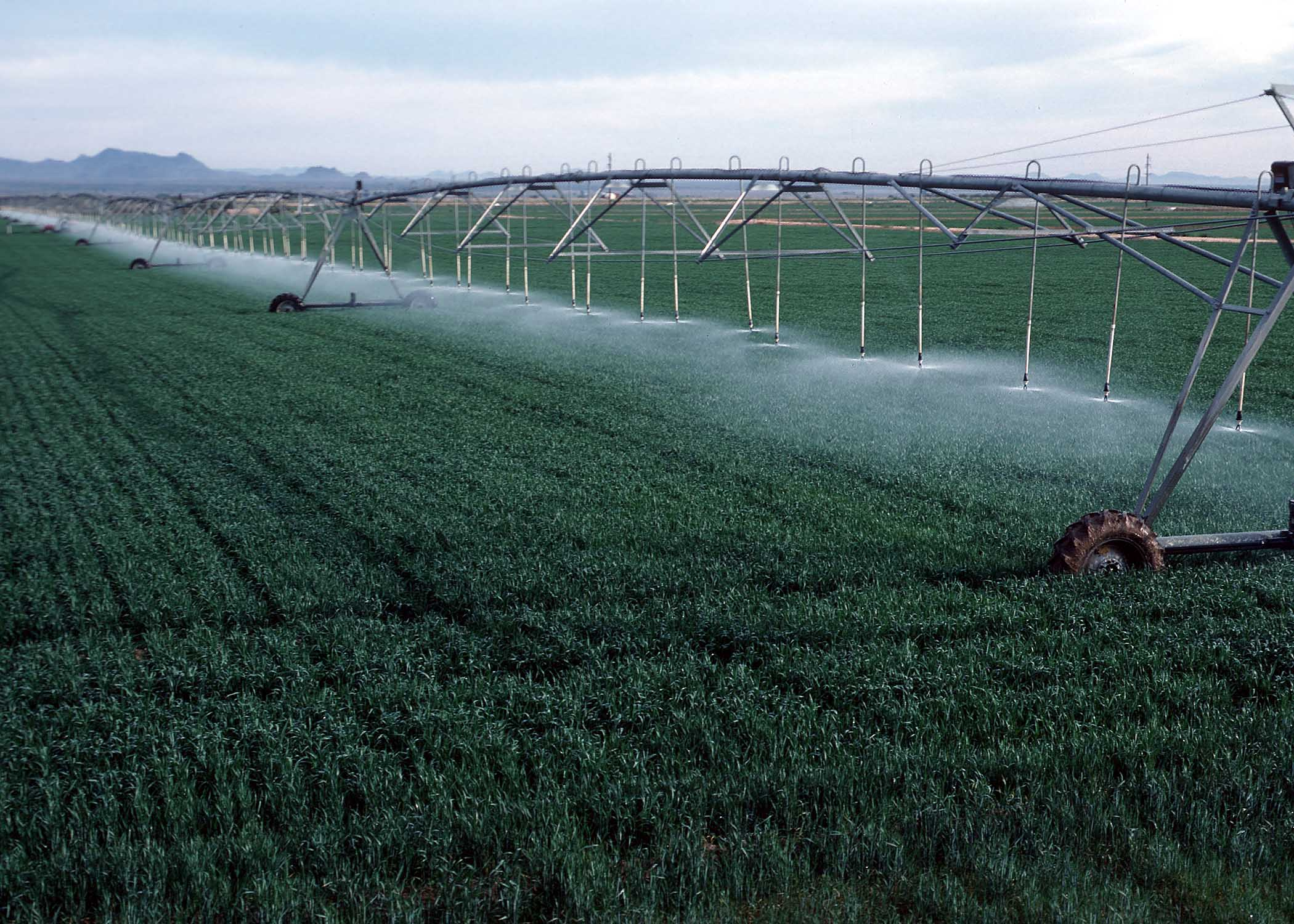
Center pivot with drop sprinklers

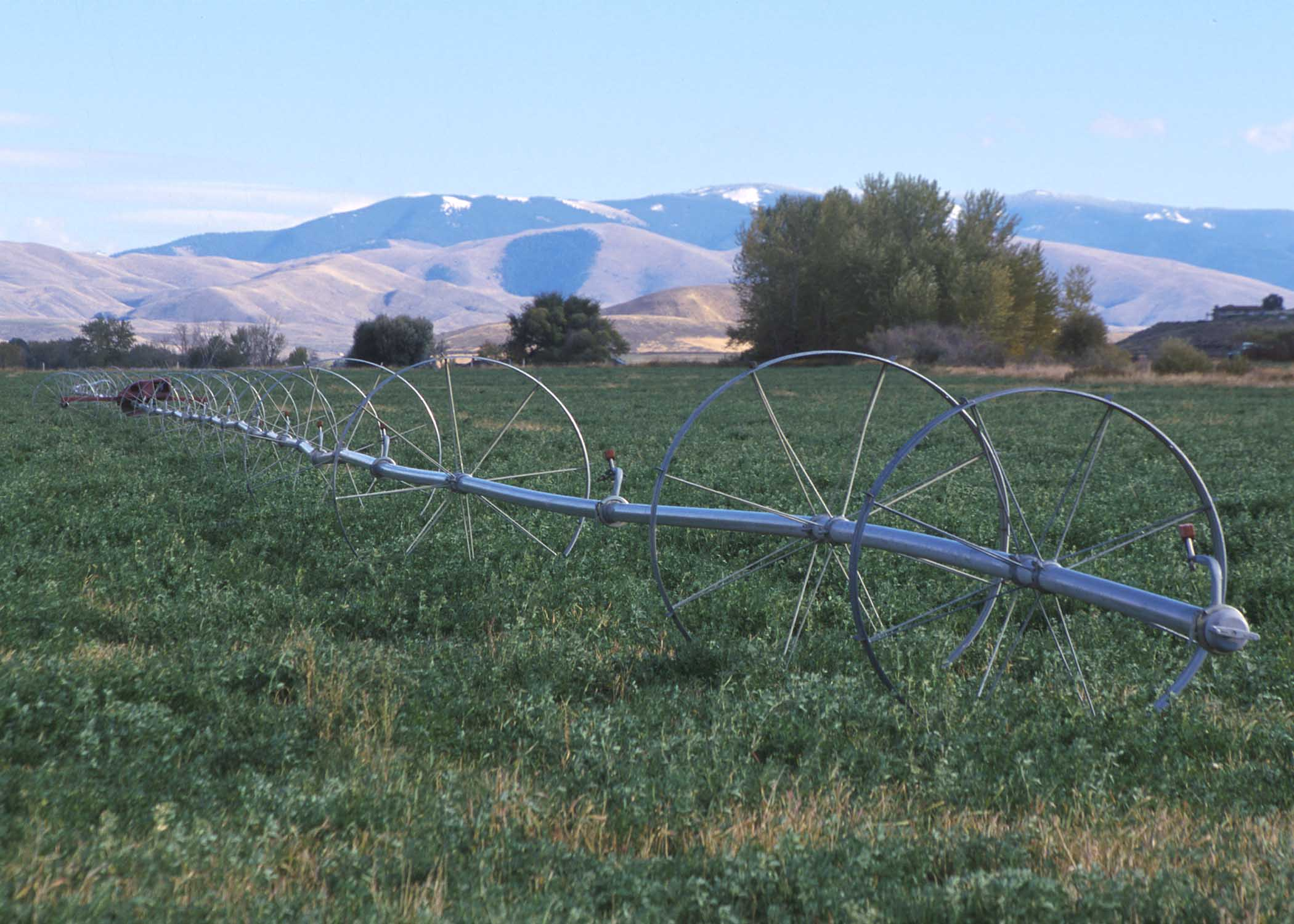
Wheel line irrigation system in Idaho, US, 2001

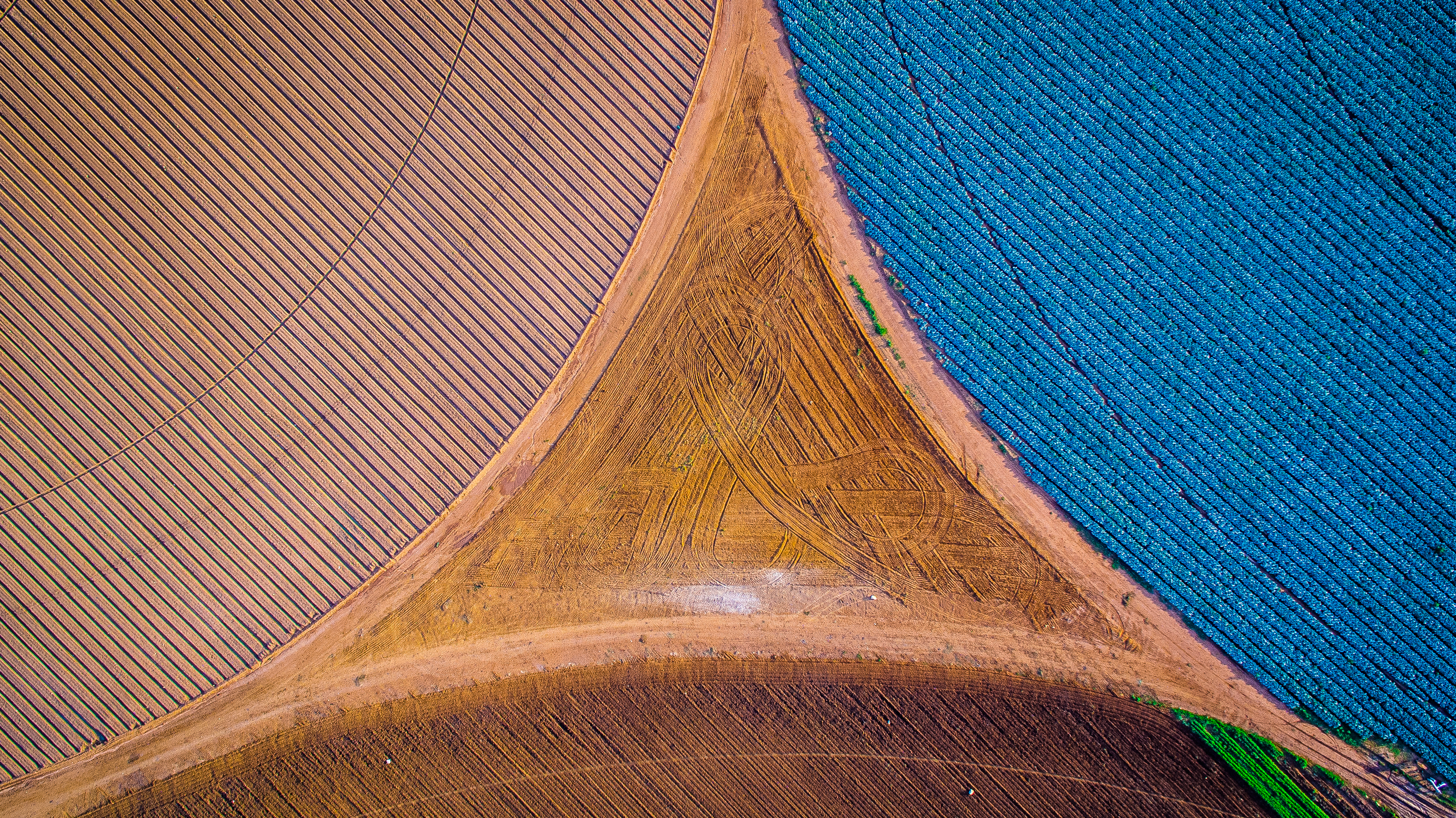
Center pivot irrigation

==== Irrigation by lateral move (side roll, wheel line, wheel move) ====
A series of pipes, each with a wheel of about 1.5 m diameter permanently affixed to its midpoint, and sprinklers along its length, is coupled together. Water is supplied at one end using a large hose. After sufficient irrigation has been applied to one strip of the field, the hose is removed, the water drained from the system, and the assembly rolled either by hand or with a purpose-built mechanism to move the sprinklers to a different position across the field. The hose is reconnected. The process is repeated in a pattern until the whole field has been irrigated.

This system is less expensive to install than a center pivot, but much more labor-intensive to operate – it does not travel automatically across the field: it applies water in a stationary strip, must be drained, and then rolled to a new strip. Most systems use 100 or 130 mm (3.9 or 5.1 in) diameter aluminum pipe. The pipe doubles as both a water transport and an axle for rotating all the wheels. A drive system (often located near the centre of the wheel line) rotates the clamped-together pipe sections as a single axle, thereby rolling the entire wheel line. Manual adjustment of individual wheel positions may be necessary if the system becomes misaligned.

Wheel line systems are limited in the amount of water they can carry and limited in the height of crops that can be irrigated. One useful feature of a lateral move system is that it consists of sections that can be easily disconnected, allowing it to adapt to the field shape as the line is moved. They are most often used for small, rectilinear, or oddly-shaped fields, hilly or mountainous regions, or in regions where labor is inexpensive.

=== Subirrigation ===
Subirrigation has been used for many years in field crops in areas with high water tables. It is a method of artificially raising the water table to allow the soil to be moistened from below the plants' root zone. Often, those systems are located on permanent grasslands in lowlands or river valleys and combined with drainage infrastructure. A system of pumping stations, canals, weirs, and gates allows it to raise or lower the water level in a network of ditches, thereby controlling the water table.

Subirrigation is also used in the commercial greenhouse production, usually for potted plants. Water is delivered from below, absorbed upwards, and the excess is collected for recycling. Typically, a solution of water and nutrients floods a container or flows through a trough for a short period (10–20 minutes) and is then pumped back into a holding tank for reuse. Sub-irrigation in greenhouses requires fairly sophisticated, expensive equipment and management. Advantages are water and nutrient conservation, and labor savings through reduced system maintenance and automation. It is similar in principle and action to subsurface basin irrigation.

Another type of subirrigation is the self-watering container, also known as a sub-irrigated planter. This consists of a planter suspended over a reservoir with a wicking material, such as a polyester rope. The water is drawn up the wick through capillary action. A similar technique is the wicking bed; this too uses capillary action.

== Efficiency ==
Modern irrigation methods are efficient enough to supply the entire field uniformly with water, ensuring each plant receives the amount it needs, neither too much nor too little. Water use efficiency in the field can be determined as follows:

- Field Water Efficiency (%) = (Water Transpired by Crop ÷ Water Applied to Field) x 100

Increased irrigation efficiency has several positive outcomes for the farmer, the community, and the wider environment. Low application efficiency indicates that the amount of water applied to the field exceeds the crop or field requirements. Increasing the application efficiency means that the amount of crop produced per unit of water increases. Improved efficiency may be achieved by applying less water to an existing field or by using water more wisely, thereby achieving higher yields in the same area of land. In some parts of the world, farmers are charged for irrigation water; hence, over-application has a direct financial cost to the farmer. Irrigation often requires pumping energy (electricity or fossil fuels) to deliver water to the field or to supply the required operating pressure. Hence, increased efficiency will reduce both water and energy costs per unit of agricultural production. A reduction in water use on one field may allow the farmer to irrigate a larger area of land, increasing total agricultural production. Low efficiency usually means that excess water is lost through seepage or runoff, both of which can result in loss of crop nutrients or pesticides with potential adverse impacts on the surrounding environment.

Improving the efficiency of irrigation is usually achieved in one of two ways: either by improving the system design or by optimizing the irrigation management. Improving system design includes converting from one form of irrigation to another (e.g., from furrow to drip irrigation) and making small changes to the current system (e.g., adjusting flow rates and operating pressures). Irrigation management refers to the scheduling of irrigation events and decisions about how much water to apply.

== Garden irrigation ==
Domestic gardens and landscaped areas around public buildings are often equipped with some form of irrigation in dry climates.

In Australia, small garden sprinklers attached to a hose became a common form of irrigation, often regulated by a timer. In the 1960s, Hugall & Hoile, a small company in Perth, Western Australia, invented a system which they called "reticulation", (Note: See wiktionary:reticulated water.) by which a garden's irrigation system was divided into segments, with solenoids (electronic valves) connected to a mechanical timer. The system became highly popular, and within 20 years, around half of all homes in Perth had automated sprinkler systems. Robert Hugall made a name for himself as "the father of backyard irrigation", while former Australian cricketer Wally Edwards (who founded Holman Industries in 1966) later targeted the DIY market in garden watering systems in the early 1990s; both men grew rich from their companies.

As climate change is causing hotter, drier weather on both sides of the continent, newer drip irrigation systems that use less water have been developed. In addition, desalination plants have been built or recommissioned in Perth, Sydney, Melbourne, Adelaide, and Brisbane, to meet the growing need for more water to keep plants and, especially, the tree canopy, growing. Adopting xeriscaping principles can minimize the need for irrigation.

== Challenges ==
=== Environmental impacts ===
Within a long period of groundwater depletion in California's Central Valley, short periods of recovery have been mostly driven by extreme weather events that typically caused flooding and had negative social, environmental, and economic consequences.

Negative impacts frequently accompany extensive irrigation. Some projects that diverted surface water for irrigation dried up the water sources, which led to a more extreme regional climate. Projects that relied on groundwater and pumped too much from underground aquifers created subsidence and salinization. Salinization of irrigation water, in turn, damaged the crops and seeped into drinking water. Pests and pathogens also thrived in the irrigation canals or ponds full of still water, which created regional outbreaks of diseases like malaria and schistosomiasis. Governments also used irrigation schemes to encourage migration, especially of more desirable populations into an area. Additionally, some of these large nationwide schemes failed to pay off at all, costing more than any benefit gained from increased crop yields.

Overdrafting (depletion) of underground aquifers: In the mid-20th century, the advent of diesel and electric motors led to systems that could pump groundwater out of major aquifers faster than drainage basins could refill them. This can lead to permanent loss of aquifer capacity, decreased water quality, ground subsidence, and other problems. The future of food production in such areas as the North China Plain, the Punjab region in India and Pakistan, and the Great Plains of the US is threatened by this phenomenon.

=== Technical challenges ===
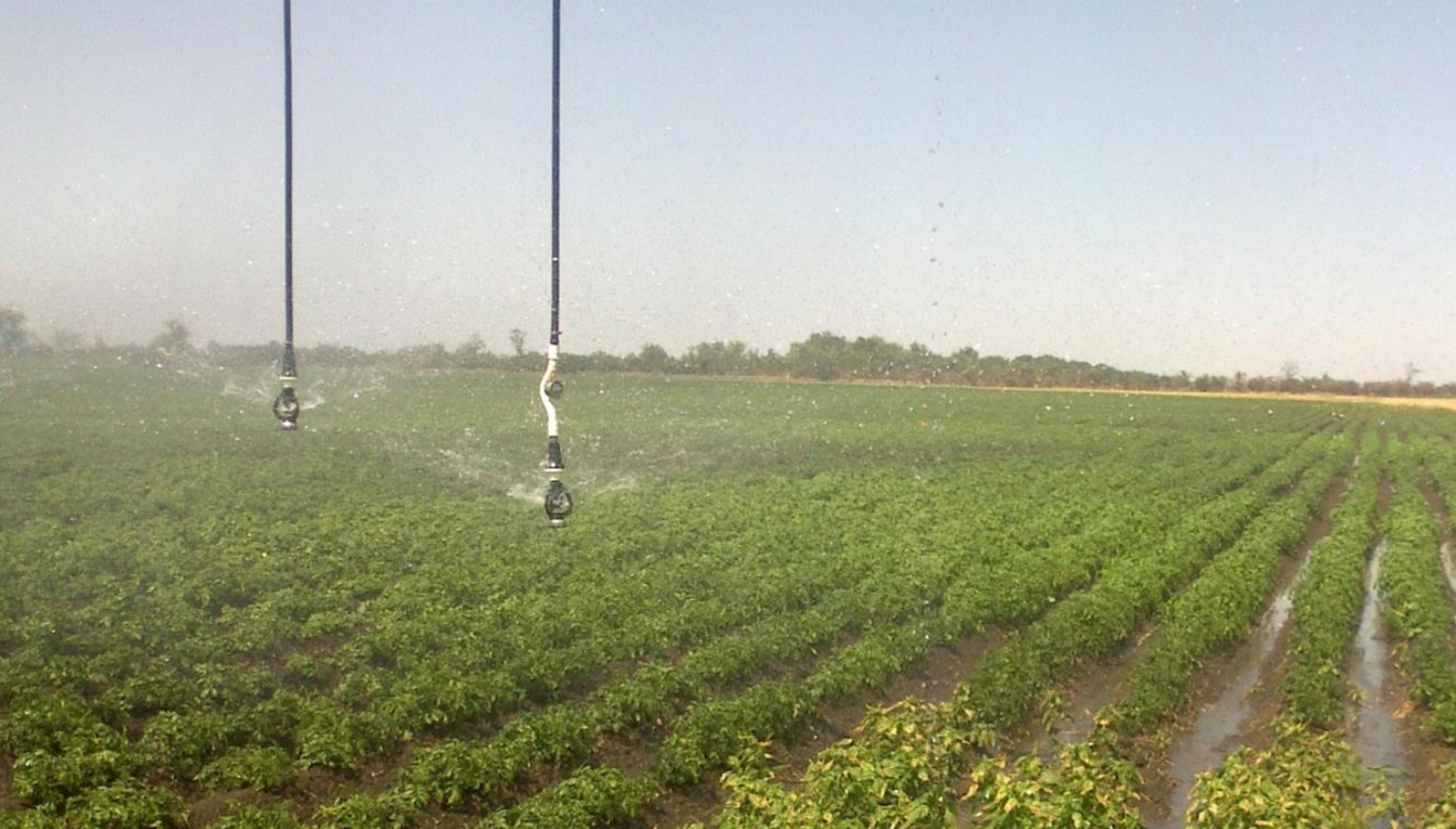
Overirrigation because of poor distribution uniformity in the furrows. Potato plants were oppressed and turned yellow

Irrigation schemes involve addressing numerous engineering and economic challenges while minimizing adverse environmental impacts. Such problems include:

- Ground subsidence (e.g. New Orleans, Louisiana)
- Underirrigation or irrigation giving only just enough water for the plant (e.g., in drip line irrigation) gives poor soil salinity control, which leads to increased soil salinity with consequent buildup of toxic salts on the soil surface in areas with high evaporation. This requires either leaching to remove these salts and a method of drainage to carry the salts away. When using drip lines, leaching is best done at regular intervals (with only a slight excess of water) so that the salt is flushed back under the plant's roots.
- Overirrigation because of poor distribution uniformity or management wastes water, chemicals, and may lead to water pollution.
- Deep drainage (from over-irrigation) may result in rising water tables, which in some instances will lead to problems of irrigation salinity requiring watertable control by some form of subsurface land drainage. For example, in Australia, over-abstraction of fresh water for intensive irrigation activities has caused 33% of the land area to be at risk of salination.
- Drainage front instability, also known as viscous fingering, where an unstable drainage front results in a pattern of fingers and viscous entrapped saturated zones.
- Irrigation with saline or high-sodium water may damage soil structure owing to the formation of alkaline soil.
- Clogging of filters: algae can clog filters, drip installations, and nozzles. Chlorination, algaecide, UV, and ultrasonic methods can be used for algae control in irrigation systems.
- Complications in accurately measuring irrigation performance, which changes over time and space, using measures such as productivity, efficiency, equity, and adequacy.
- Macro-irrigation, typical in intensive agriculture, where also are used agrochemicals, often causes eutrophication.

=== Social aspects ===
- Competition for surface water rights
- Assisting smallholders in sustainably and collectively managing irrigation technology and changes in technology.

== History ==
=== Ancient history ===
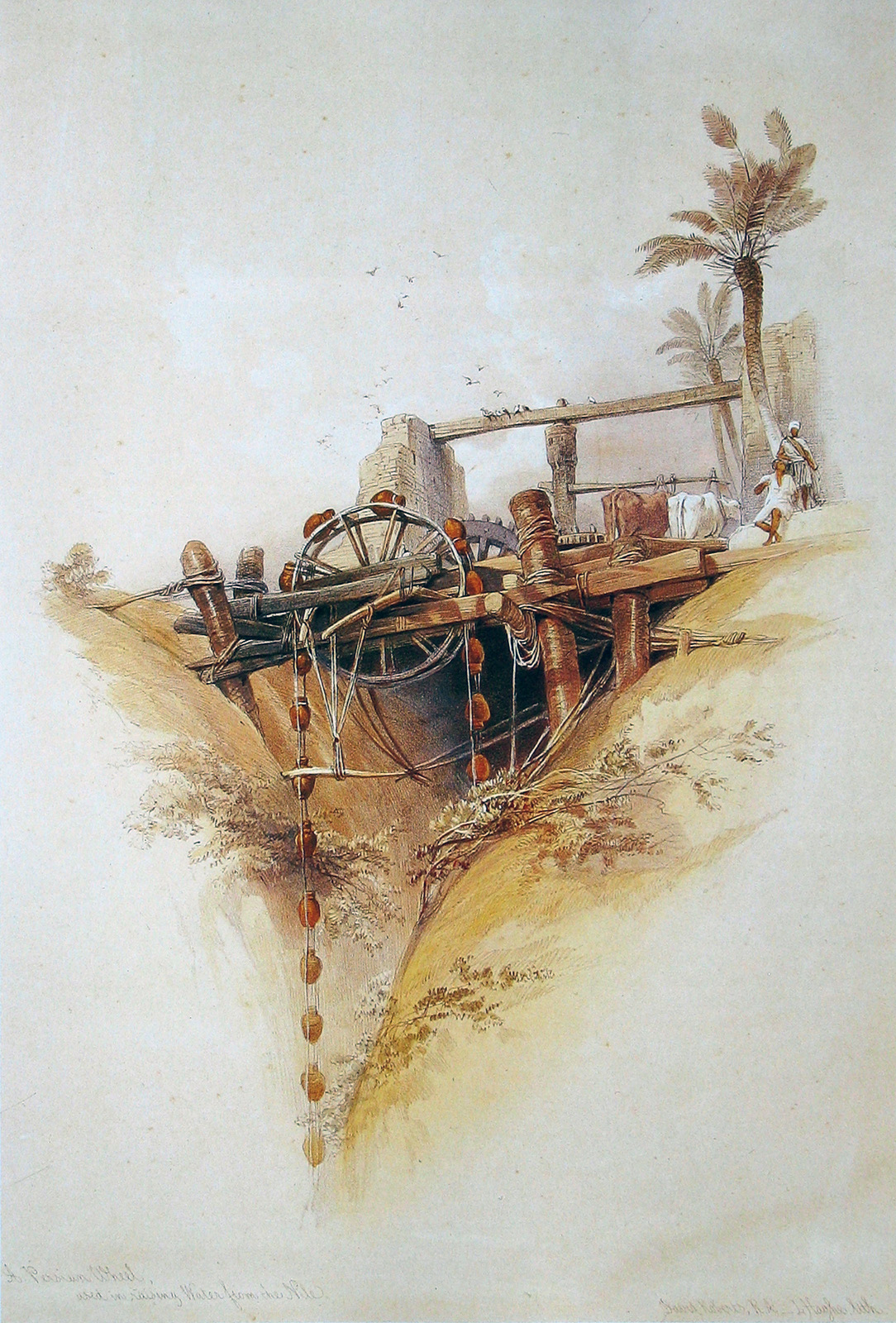
Animal-powered irrigation, Upper Egypt, ca. 1846

Archaeological investigations have found evidence of irrigation in areas lacking sufficient natural rainfall to support rainfed agriculture. Some of the earliest known use of the technology dates to the 6th millennium BCE in Khuzistan in the south-west of Iran. The site of Choga Mami, in present-day Iraq on the border with Iran, is believed to be the earliest to show the first canal irrigation in operation at about 6000 BCE.

Irrigation was used to manipulate water in the alluvial plains of the Indus Valley Civilization, with its application estimated to have begun around 4500 BCE and to have drastically increased the size and prosperity of their agricultural settlements. The Indus Valley Civilization developed sophisticated irrigation and water-storage systems, including artificial reservoirs at Girnar dated to 3000 BCE, and an early canal irrigation system from c. 2600 BCE. Large-scale agriculture was practiced, with an extensive network of canals used for irrigation.

Farmers in the Mesopotamian plain used irrigation from at least the third millennium BCE. They developed perennial irrigation, regularly watering crops throughout the growing season by coaxing water through a matrix of small channels formed in the field. Ancient Egyptians practiced basin irrigation using the flooding of the Nile to inundate land plots which had been surrounded by dikes. The flood water remained until the fertile sediment had settled before the engineers returned the surplus to the watercourse. There is evidence of the ancient Egyptian pharaoh Amenemhet III in the twelfth dynasty (about 1800 BCE) using the natural lake of the Faiyum Oasis as a reservoir to store surpluses of water for use during dry seasons. The lake swelled annually from the flooding of the Nile.

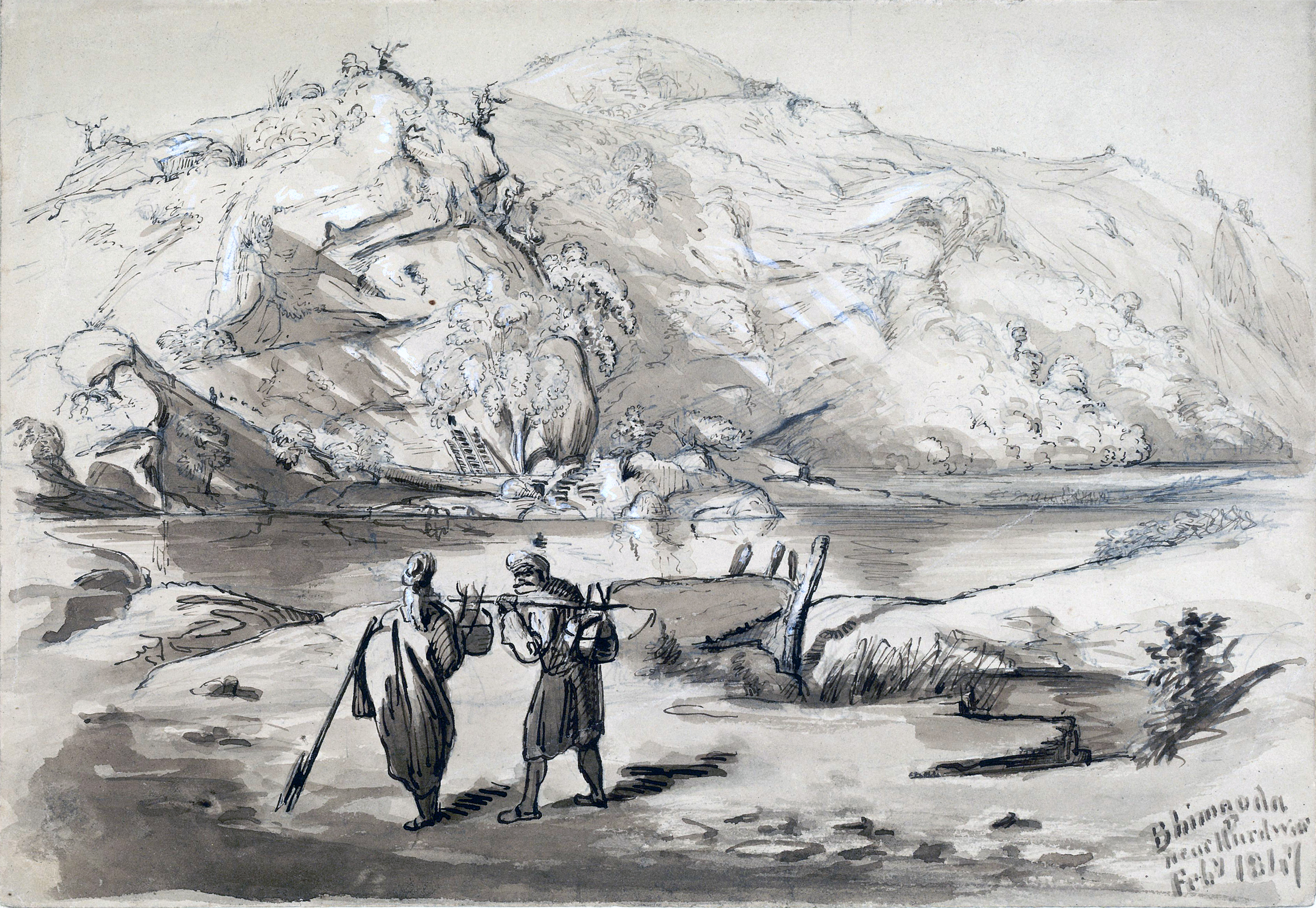
Young engineers restoring and developing the old Mughal irrigation system in 1847 during the reign of the Mughal Emperor Bahadur Shah II in Indian subcontinent

The Ancient Nubians developed a form of irrigation by using a waterwheel-like device called a sakia. Irrigation began in Nubia between the third and second millennia BCE. It largely depended upon the flood waters that would flow through the Nile River and other rivers in what is now the Sudan.

In sub-Saharan Africa, irrigation reached the Niger River region cultures and civilizations by the first or second millennium BCE and was based on wet-season flooding and water harvesting.

Evidence of terrace irrigation occurs in pre-Columbian America, early Syria, India, and China. In the Zana Valley of the Andes Mountains in Peru, archaeologists have found remains of three irrigation canals radiocarbon-dated from the 4th millennium BCE, the 3rd millennium BCE and the 9th century CE. These canals provide the earliest record of irrigation in the New World. Traces of a canal possibly dating from the 5th millennium BCE were found under the 4th-millennium canal.

Ancient Persia (modern-day Iran) used irrigation as early as the 6th millennium BCE to grow barley in areas with insufficient rainfall. The Qanats, developed in ancient Persia about 800 BCE, are among the oldest known irrigation methods still in use today. They are now found in Asia, the Middle East, and North Africa. The system comprises a network of vertical wells and gently sloping tunnels driven into the sides of cliffs and steep hills to tap groundwater. The noria, a water wheel with clay pots around the rim powered by the flow of the stream (or by animals where the water source was still), first came into use at about this time among Roman settlers in North Africa. By 150 BCE, the pots were fitted with valves to allow smoother filling as they were forced underwater.

==== Sri Lanka ====
The irrigation works of ancient Sri Lanka, the earliest dating from about 300 BCE in the reign of King Pandukabhaya, and under continuous development for the next thousand years, were one of the most complex irrigation systems of the ancient world. They included underground canals and artificial reservoirs to store water. These reservoirs and canal systems were used primarily to irrigate paddy fields, which require a lot of water to cultivate. Most of these irrigation systems still exist undamaged to this day in Anuradhapura and Polonnaruwa, thanks to their advanced and precise engineering. The system was extensively restored and further extended during the reign of King Parakrama Bahu (1153–1186 CE).

==== China ====
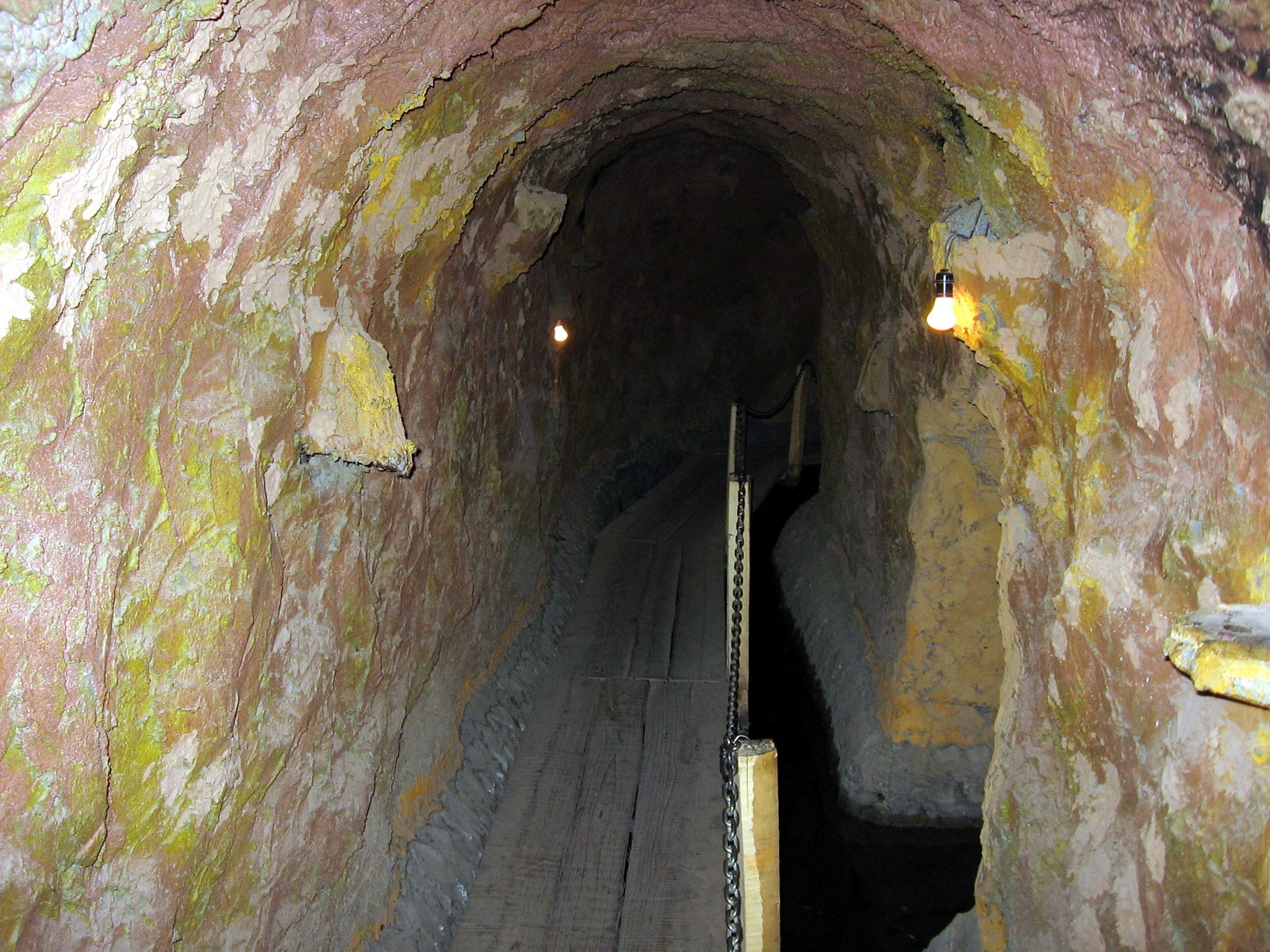
Inside a karez tunnel at Turpan, Xinjiang, China

The oldest known hydraulic engineers of China were Sunshu Ao (6th century BCE) of the Spring and Autumn period and Ximen Bao (5th century BCE) of the Warring States period, both of whom worked on large irrigation projects. In the Sichuan region belonging to the state of Qin of ancient China, the Dujiangyan Irrigation System devised by the Qin Chinese hydrologist and irrigation engineer Li Bing was built in 256 BCE to irrigate a vast area of farmland that today still supplies water. By the 2nd century CE, during the Han dynasty, the Chinese also used chain pumps which lifted water from a lower elevation to a higher one. These were powered by manual foot-pedal, hydraulic waterwheels, or rotating mechanical wheels pulled by oxen. The water was used for public works, providing water for urban residential quarters and palace gardens, but mostly for irrigation of farmland canals and channels in the fields.

==== Korea ====
Korea, Chang Yŏngsil, also known as Jang Yeong-sil, a Korean engineer of the Joseon dynasty, under the active direction of the king, Sejong the Great, invented the world's first rain gauge, uryanggye (Korean: 우량계) in 1441. It was installed in irrigation tanks as part of a nationwide system to measure and collect rainfall for agricultural applications. Planners and farmers could better use the information gathered in the survey with this instrument.

==== North America ====
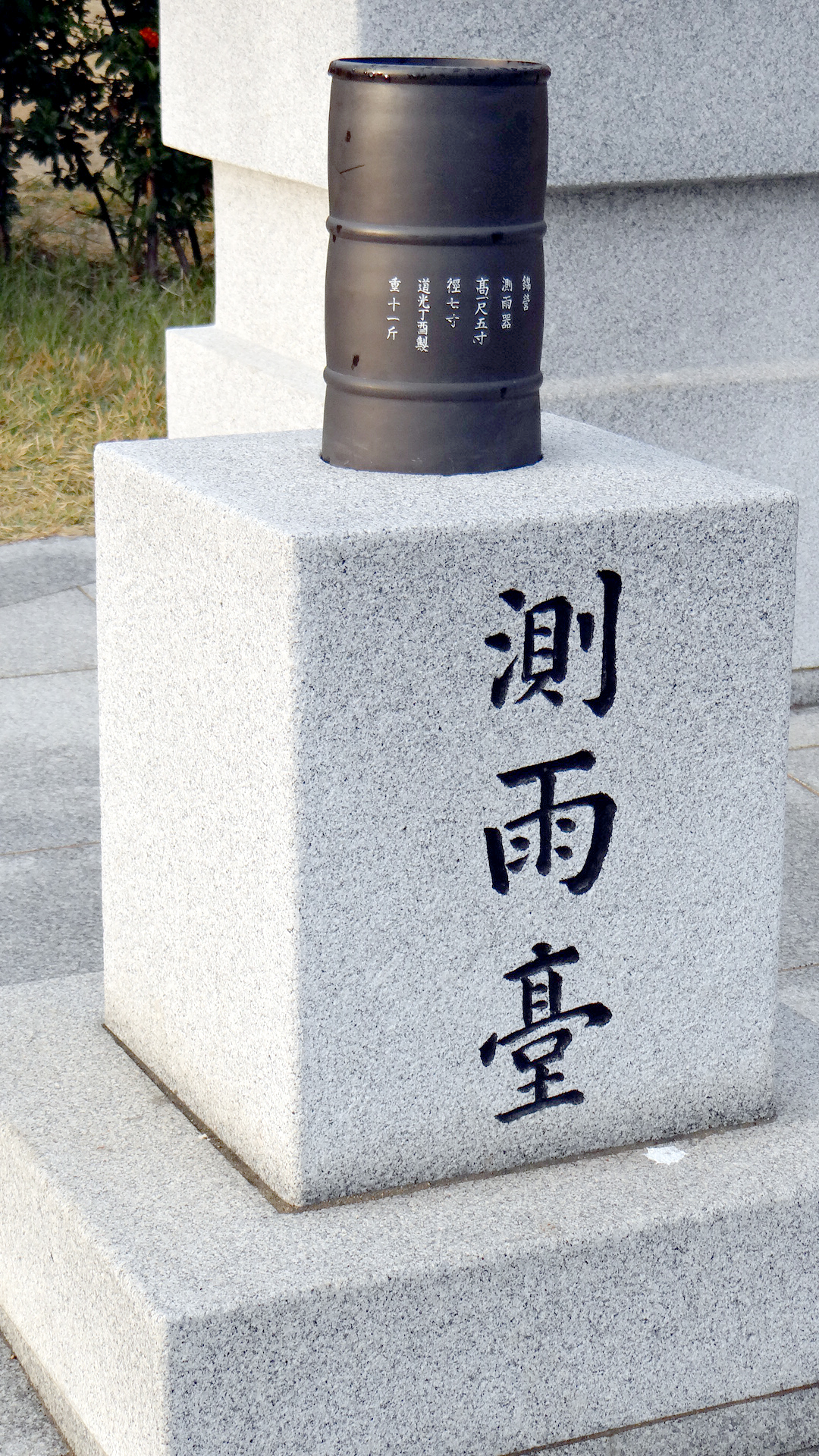
A Cheugugi at Jang Yeong-sil Science Garden in Busan

The earliest agricultural irrigation canal system known in the area of the present-day United States dates to between 1200 BCE and 800 BCE and was discovered by Desert Archaeology, Inc. in Marana, Arizona (adjacent to Tucson) in 2009. The irrigation-canal system predates the Hohokam culture by two thousand years and belongs to an unidentified culture. In North America, the Hohokam were the only culture known to rely on irrigation canals to water their crops, and their irrigation systems supported the largest population in the Southwest by CE 1300. The Hohokam constructed simple canals, combined with weirs, for their agricultural pursuits. Between the 7th and 14th centuries, they built and maintained extensive irrigation networks along the lower Salt and middle Gila Rivers that rivaled the complexity of those used in the ancient Near East, Egypt, and China. These were constructed using relatively simple excavation tools, without the benefit of advanced engineering technologies, and achieved drops of a few feet per mile, balancing erosion and siltation. The Hohokam cultivated cotton, tobacco, maize, beans, and squash varieties and harvested an assortment of wild plants. Late in the Hohokam Chronological Sequence, they used extensive dry-farming systems, primarily to grow agave for food and fiber. Their reliance on agricultural strategies based on canal irrigation, vital in their less-than-hospitable desert environment and arid climate, provided the basis for the aggregation of rural populations into stable urban centers.

==== South America ====
The oldest known irrigation canals in the Americas are in the desert of northern Peru in the Zaña Valley near the hamlet of Nanchoc. The canals have been radiocarbon dated to at least 3400 BCE and possibly as old as 4700 BCE. The canals at that time irrigated crops such as peanuts, squash, manioc, chenopods, a relative of Quinoa, and later maize.

=== Modern history ===
The scale of global irrigation increased dramatically over the 20th century. In 1800, 8 million hectares were irrigated; in 1950, 94 million hectares, and in 1990, 235 million hectares. By 1990, 30% of the global food production came from irrigated land. Irrigation techniques across the globe include canals redirecting surface water, groundwater pumping, and diverting water from dams. National governments led most irrigation schemes within their borders, but private investors and other nations, especially the United States, China, and European countries like the United Kingdom, funded and organized some schemes within other nations. Irrigation enabled the production of more crops, especially commodity crops in areas that otherwise could not support them. Countries frequently invested in irrigation to increase wheat, rice, or cotton production, often with the overarching goal of increasing self-sufficiency. In the 20th century, global anxiety, specifically about the American cotton monopoly, fueled many empirical irrigation projects: Britain began developing irrigation in India, the Ottomans in Egypt, the French in Algeria, the Portuguese in Angola, the Germans in Togo, and Soviets in Central Asia.

Negative impacts frequently accompany extensive irrigation. Some projects that diverted surface water for irrigation dried up water sources, leading to a more extreme regional climate. Projects that relied on groundwater and pumped too much from underground aquifers created subsidence and salinization. Salinization of irrigation water damaged the crops and seeped into drinking water. Pests and pathogens also thrived in the irrigation canals or ponds full of still water, which created regional outbreaks of diseases like malaria and schistosomiasis. Governments also used irrigation schemes to encourage migration, especially of more desirable populations into an area. Additionally, some of these large nationwide schemes failed to pay off at all, costing more than any benefit gained from increased crop yields.

==== American West ====
Irrigated land in the United States increased from 300,000 acres in 1880 to 4.1 million in 1890 to 7.3 million in 1900. Two thirds of this irrigation sources from groundwater or small ponds and reservoirs, while the other one third comes from large dams. One of the main attractions of irrigation in the West was its increased dependability compared to rainfall-watered agriculture in the East. Proponents argued that farmers with a dependable water supply could more easily get loans from bankers interested in this more predictable farming model. Most irrigation in the Great Plains region derived from underground aquifers. Euro-American farmers who colonized the region in the 19th century tried to grow the commodity crops they were used to, such as wheat, corn, and alfalfa, but rainfall limited their yields. Between the late 1800s and the 1930s, farmers used wind-powered pumps to draw groundwater. These windpumps had limited power, but the development of gas-powered pumps in the mid-1930s pushed wells deep into the Ogallala Aquifer. Farmers irrigated fields by laying pipes across the field with sprinklers at intervals, a labor-intensive process, until the advent of the center-pivot sprinkler after World War II, which made irrigation significantly easier. By the 1970s, farmers drained the aquifer ten times faster than it could recharge, and by 1993, they had removed half of the accessible water.

Large-scale federal funding and intervention pushed through the majority of irrigation projects in the West, especially in California, Colorado, Arizona, and Nevada. At first, plans to increase irrigated farmland, largely by giving land to farmers and asking them to find water, failed across the board. Congress passed the Desert Land Act in 1877 and the Carey Act in 1894, which only marginally increased irrigation. Only in 1902 did Congress pass the National Reclamation Act, which channeled money from the sale of western public lands, in parcels up to 160 acres large, into irrigation projects on public or private land in the arid West. The Congressmen who passed the law and their wealthy supporters supported Western irrigation because it would increase American exports, 'reclaim' the West, and push the Eastern poor out West for a better life.

While the National Reclamation Act was the most successful piece of federal irrigation legislation, its implementation did not go as planned. The Reclamation Service chose to push most of the Act's money toward construction rather than settlement, so the Service overwhelmingly prioritized building large dams like the Hoover Dam. Over the 20th century, Congress and state governments grew more frustrated with the Reclamation Service and the irrigation schemes. Frederick Newell, head of the Reclamation Service, proving uncompromising and challenging to work with, falling crop prices, resistance to delay debt payments, and refusal to begin new projects until the completion of old ones all contributed. The Reclamation Extension Act of 1914, transferring a significant amount of irrigation decision-making power regarding irrigation projects from the Reclamation Service to Congress, was in many ways a result of increasing political unpopularity of the Reclamation Service.

In the lower Colorado Basin of Arizona, Colorado, and Nevada, the states derive irrigation water largely from rivers, especially the Colorado River, which irrigates more than 4.5 million acres of land, with a less significant amount coming from groundwater. In the 1952 case Arizona v. California, Arizona sued California for increased access to the Colorado River, under the grounds that their groundwater supply could not sustain their almost entirely irrigation-based agricultural economy, which they won. California, which began irrigating in earnest in the 1870s in San Joaquin Valley, had passed the Wright Act of 1887 permitting agricultural communities to construct and operate needed irrigation works. The Colorado River also irrigates large fields in California's Imperial Valley, fed by the National Reclamation Act-built All-American Canal.

==== Soviet Central Asia ====
When the Bolsheviks conquered Central Asia in 1917, the native Kazakhs, Uzbeks, and Turkmens used minimal irrigation. The Slavic immigrants pushed into the area by the Tsarist government brought their irrigation methods, including waterwheels, the use of rice paddies to restore salted land, and underground irrigation channels. Russians dismissed these techniques as crude and inefficient. Despite this, tsarist officials maintained these systems through the late 19th century without other solutions.

Before conquering the area, the Russian government accepted a 1911 American proposal to send hydraulic experts to Central Asia to investigate the potential for large-scale irrigation. A 1918 decree by Lenin then encouraged irrigation development in the region, which began in the 1930s. When it did, Stalin and other Soviet leaders prioritized large-scale, ambitious hydraulic projects, especially along the Volga River. The Soviet irrigation push stemmed mainly from their late 19th century fears of the American cotton monopoly and subsequent desire to achieve cotton self-sufficiency. They had built up their textile manufacturing industry in the 19th century, requiring increased cotton and irrigation, as the region did not receive enough rainfall to support cotton farming.

The Russians built dams on the Don and Kuban Rivers for irrigation, removing freshwater flow from the Sea of Azov and making it much saltier. Depletion and salinization scourged other areas of the Russian irrigation project. In the 1950s, Soviet officials began also diverting the Syr Darya and the Amu Darya, which fed the Aral Sea. Before diversion, the rivers delivered 55 cubic kilometres (13 cu mi) of water to the Aral Sea per year, but after diversion, they delivered only 6 cubic kilometres (1.4 cu mi). Because of its reduced inflow, the Aral Sea covered less than half of its original seabed, which made the regional climate more extreme and created airborne salinization, lowering nearby crop yields.

By 1975, the USSR used eight times as much water as it had in 1913, mostly for irrigation. Russia's expansion of irrigation began to decline in the late 1980s, and irrigated hectares in Central Asia peaked at 7 million. Mikhail Gorbachev killed a proposed plan to reverse the Ob and Yenisei for irrigation in 1986, and the breakup of the USSR in 1991 ended Russian investment in Central Asian cotton irrigation.

==== Africa ====
Various irrigation schemes with different goals and success rates were implemented across Africa in the 20th century, but were all influenced by colonial forces. The Tana River Irrigation Scheme in eastern Kenya, completed between 1948 and 1963, opened up new lands for agriculture. The Kenyan government attempted to resettle the area with detainees from the Mau Mau uprising. Italian oil drillers discovered Libya's underground water resources during the Italian colonization of Libya. This water lay dormant until 1969, when Muammar al-Gaddafi and American Armand Hammer built the Great Man-Made River to deliver the Saharan water to the coast. The water largely contributed to irrigation but cost four to ten times more than the crops it produced were worth.

In 1912, the Union of South Africa established an irrigation department and began investing in water storage infrastructure and irrigation systems. The government used irrigation and dam-building to further social goals such as poverty relief by creating construction jobs for poor whites and by developing irrigation schemes to increase white farming. One of their first significant irrigation projects was the Hartbeespoort Dam, begun in 1916 to elevate the living conditions of the 'poor whites' in the region and eventually completed as a 'whites only' employment opportunity. The Pretoria irrigation scheme, Kammanassie project, and Buchuberg irrigation scheme on the Orange River all followed in the same vein in the 1920s and 30s.

In Egypt, modern irrigation began with Muhammad Ali Pasha in the mid-1800s, who sought to achieve Egyptian independence from the Ottomans through increased trade with Europe—specifically cotton exportation. His administration proposed replacing the traditional Nile basin irrigation, which took advantage of the annual ebb and flow of the Nile, with irrigation barrages in the lower Nile, which better suited cotton production. Egypt devoted 105,000 ha to cotton in 1861, a figure that increased fivefold by 1865. Most of their exports were shipped to England, and the United States Civil War-induced cotton scarcity in the 1860s cemented Egypt as England's cotton producer. As the Egyptian economy became more dependent on cotton in the 20th century, controlling even small Nile floods became more important. Cotton production was more at risk of destruction than more common crops like barley or wheat. After the British occupation of Egypt in 1882, the British intensified the conversion to perennial irrigation with the construction of the Delta Barrage, the Assiut Barrage, and the first Aswan Dam. Perennial irrigation decreased local control over water and made traditional subsistence farming or the farming of other crops incredibly difficult, eventually contributing to widespread peasant bankruptcy and the 1879-1882 'Urabi revolt.

== Examples by country ==
See the below template:

(Link to a similar template for mobile users.)

== Gallery ==
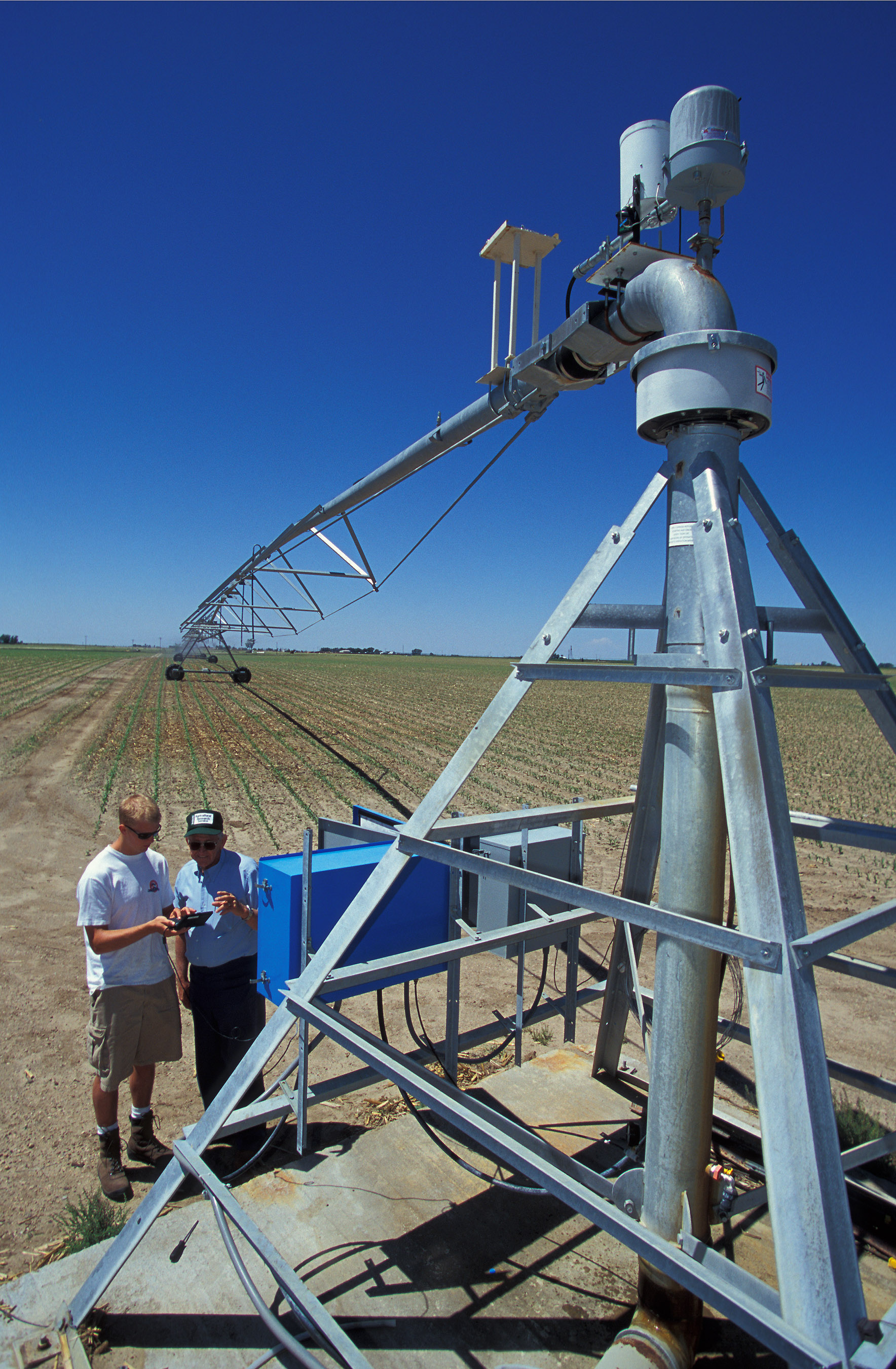
The hub of a center-pivot irrigation system

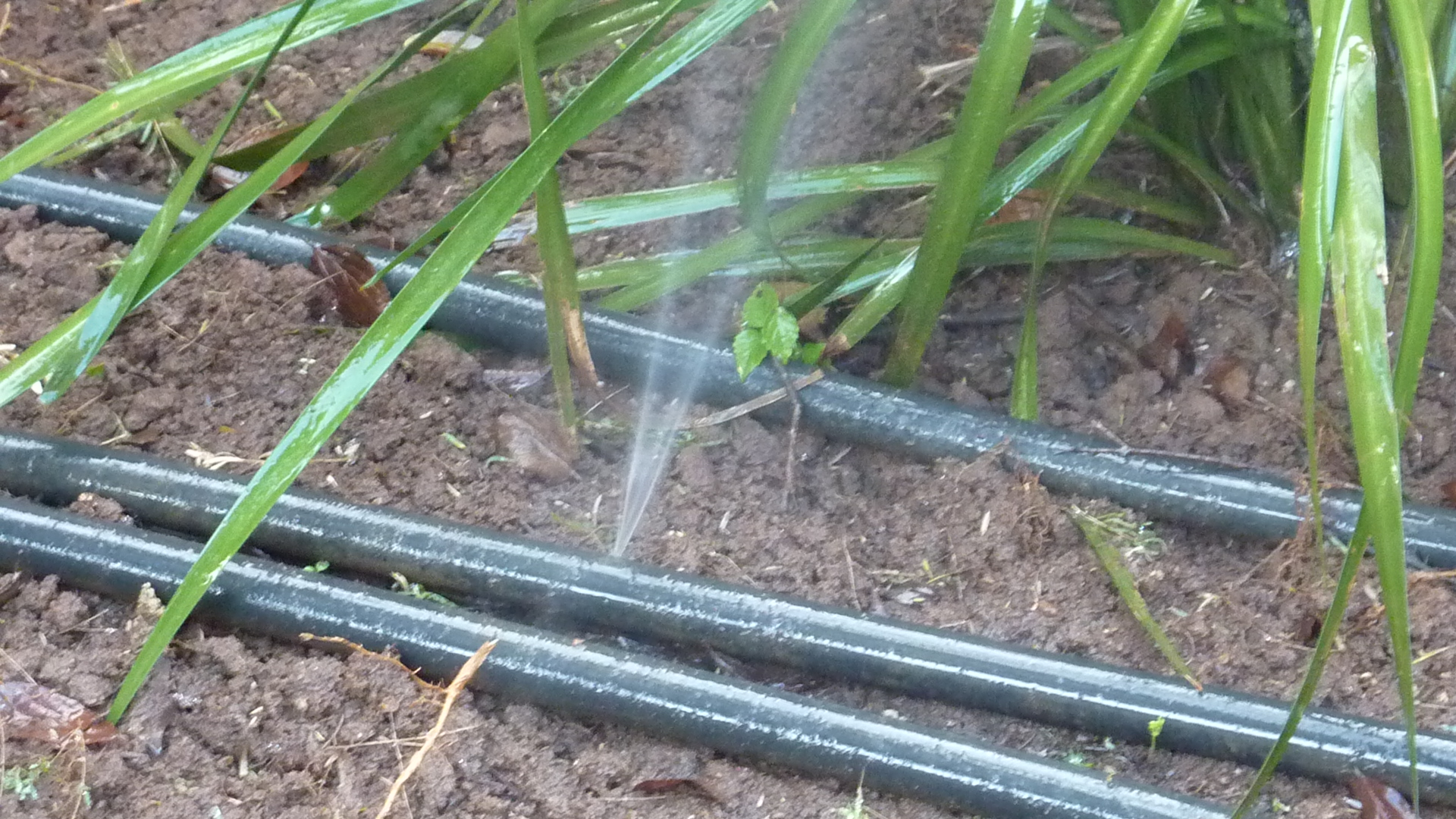
Leaks in micro-irrigation drip lines

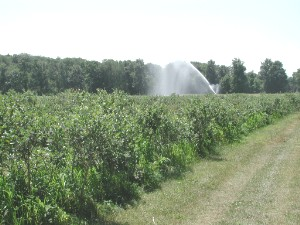
Sprinkler irrigation of blueberries in Plainville, New York, United States

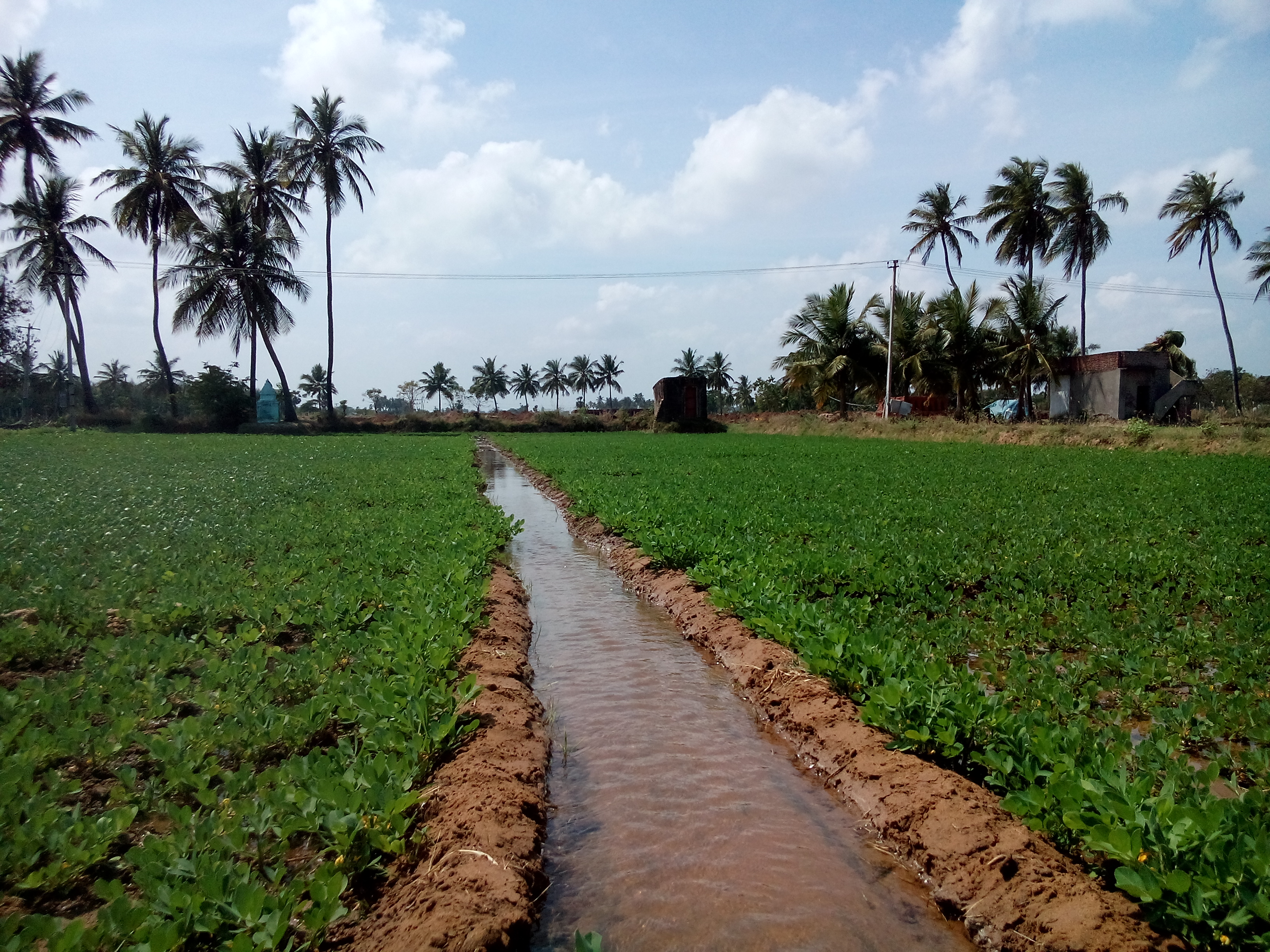
Irrigation in Tamil Nadu, India

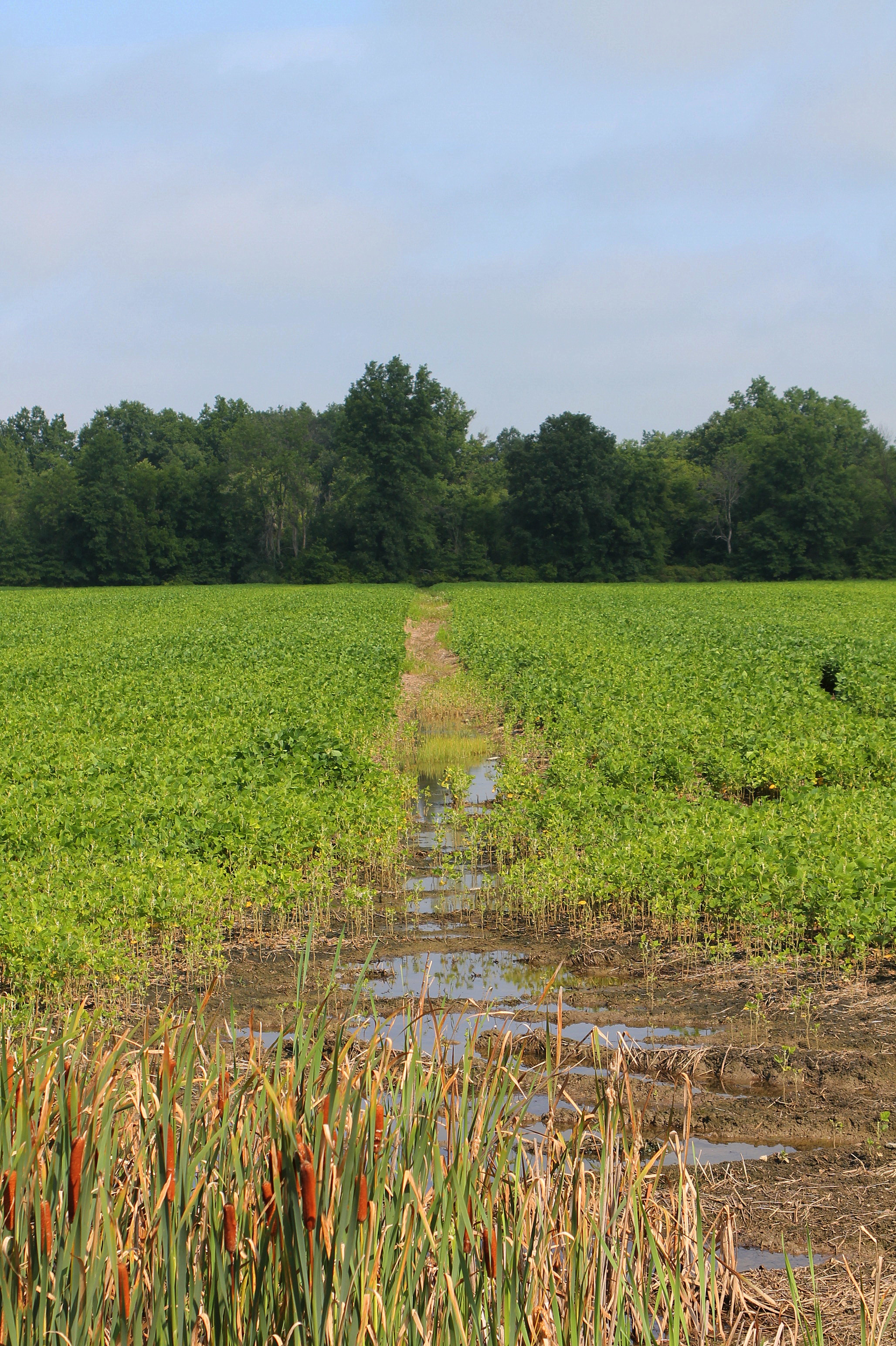
Irrigation ditch in Montour County, Pennsylvania, USA

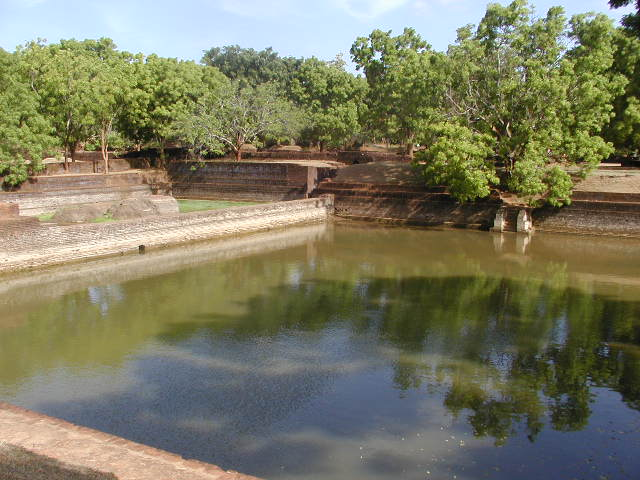
Water gardens in Sigiriya, Sri Lanka

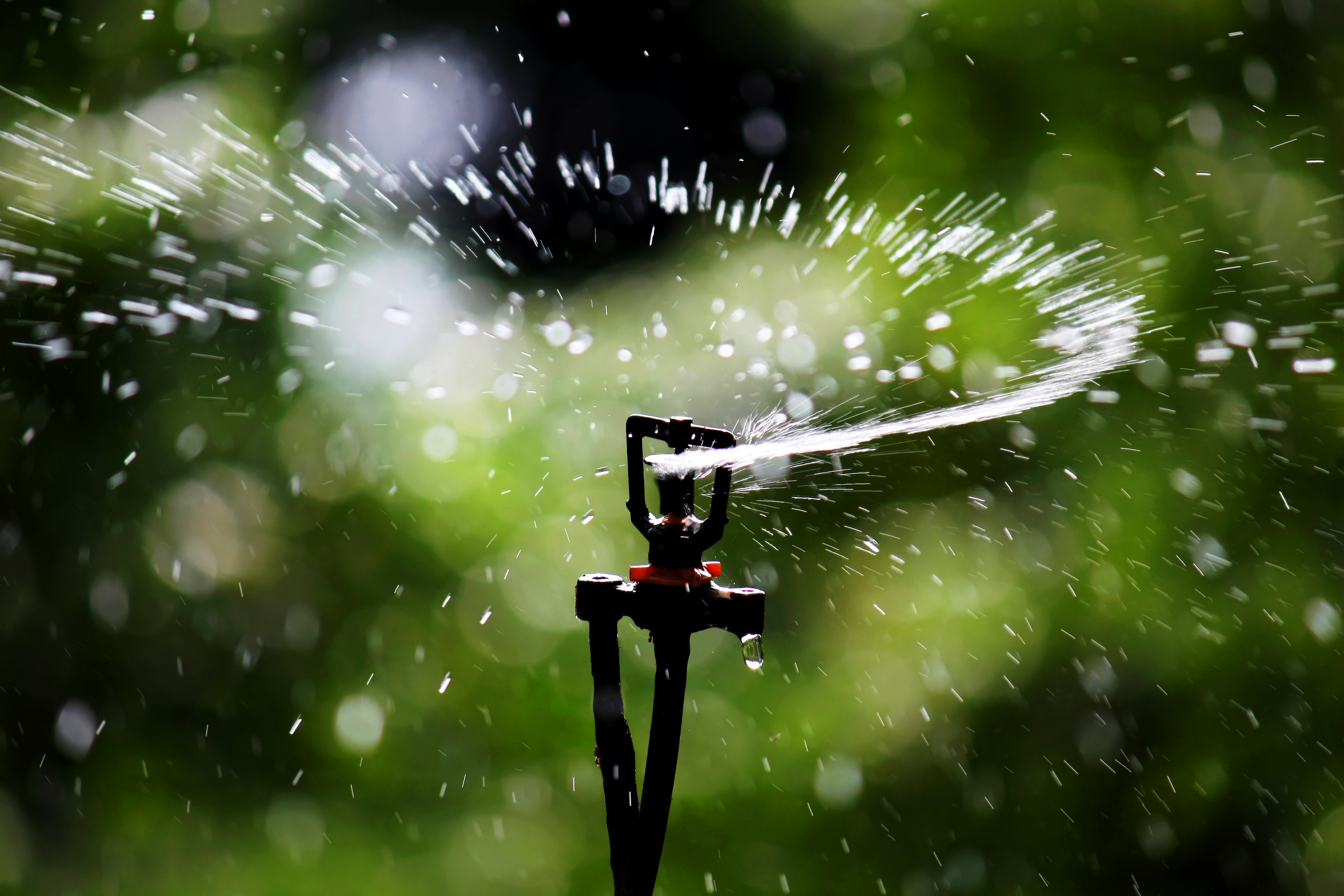
Micro-sprinkler

== See also ==
- Deficit irrigation
- Gezira Scheme
- Irrigation management
- Irrigation statistics
- Leaf Sensor
- Lift irrigation scheme
- List of countries by irrigated land area
- Surface irrigation
- Tidal irrigation
- Water use in alluvial fans

== Sources ==
This article incorporates text from a free content work. Licensed under CC BY 4.0 (license statement/permission). Text taken from The State of the World’s Land and Water Resources for Food and Agriculture 2025, Food and Agriculture Organization of the United Nations (FAO).

This article incorporates text from a free content work. Licensed under CC BY 4.0 (license statement/permission). Text taken from World Food and Agriculture – Statistical Yearbook 2025, Food and Agriculture Organization of the United Nations.

== Sources ==
This article incorporates text from a free content work. Licensed under CC BY-SA IGO 3.0 (license statement/permission). Text taken from World Food and Agriculture – Statistical Yearbook 2023, FAO, FAO.
