= Distribution uniformity =

Distribution uniformity or DU in irrigation is a measure of how uniformly water is applied to the area being watered, normally expressed as percentage, and not to be confused with efficiency. The distribution uniformity is often calculated when performing an irrigation audit. The DU should not be confused with the coefficient of uniformity (CU) which is often preferred for describing the performance of overhead pressurized systems.

The most common measure of DU is the low quarter DU expressed as DUlq, which is a measure of the average of the lowest quarter of samples, divided by the average of all samples expressed as percentage. The higher the DUlq, the more uniform the coverage of the area measured. If all samples are equal, the DUlq is 1.0 or 100%. There is no universal value of DUlq for satisfactory system performance. A value of >.80 or 80% is considered above average.

Distribution uniformity may be helpful as a starting point for irrigation scheduling. For example, an irrigator might want to apply not less than one inch of water to the area being watered. If the DU were 75% (0.75), then the total amount to be applied would be the desired amount of water, divided by the DU. In this case, the required irrigation would be 1.33 inches of water, so that only a very small area received less than one inch. The lower the DU, the less uniform the distribution at the plane of data collection and the more water that may be needed to meet the minimum requirement.

Catchments are commonly used to determine sprinkler DU and one must be reminded that data collection most often occurs above grade and above the root zone where plant uptake normally occurs. Many factors may affect water distribution or redistribution between catchment plane and root zone; slope, plant canopy, thatch, mulch, infiltration rate, etc.. Soil type and root horizon may nullify the need for high DUlq sprinklers.

Low sprinkler DUlq does not guarantee inefficiency, nor does high DUlq guarantee efficiency.

An alternative is Christiansen's uniformity coefficient (CU), defined as the average depth of irrigation water applied minus the average absolute deviation from this depth, all divided by the average depth applied (ASAE, 1998).
