= Wicking bed =

Agricultural irrigation system

A wicking bed is an agricultural irrigation system used in arid countries where water is scarce, devised by Australian inventor Colin Austin. It can be used both in (arid) fields as in containers. Besides use in fields/containers outdoors, it can also be used indoors (i.e. greenhouse).

The system is designed to increase food production while using approximately 50% less water than traditional irrigation by utilizing underground water reservoirs filled with decomposing organic matter and the process of evaporation.

Despite being an irrigation system (which can even be fitted with automated refill capability via rainwater tank and float-valve), it remains relatively low-tech.

There are several commercially available wicking bed products, including recycled plastic wicking "cells" that are reported to reduce water use by up to 80% when compared to above ground irrigation.

== Advantages ==
There are several benefits to wicking beds, many of which arise due from the water moving upwards from below:

=== Water Efficiency ===
Watering from below produces less evaporation than top watered methods. Significant water savings are generated given the moisture gradient is the reverse of that from watering methods.

=== Deeper Roots ===
Plant roots seek out moisture. Deep watering is often recommended for this reason. Wicking beds have a moisture gradient that encourages roots downwards. This gives more stable plants that are healthier and less prone to water stress when surfaces dry out

=== Lower Fungal Disease ===
The surface of a correctly constructed wicking bed is generally dry unless it has been raining. This means a lower level of surface fungal issues. This particularly benefits vegetables prone to fungal infections, such as cucumber, tomato, and squash varieties

=== Surface Pest Control ===
Slugs, snails, and other mollusks much prefer a moist surface. They find wicking beds more challenging to establish in and move between plants.

=== Nutrient Retention ===
Soluble fertilisers often wash through soil into the water table. However, in a wicking bed, these are retained in the reservoir to be wicked back up through the soil. This means less fertiliser is needed.

== Disadvantages ==
=== Deep Rooted / Invasive Plants ===
Water will only wick up 300-400mm in potting mix. This is great for vegetables and other relatively shallow-rooted plants but unsuitable for deeper rootstock. Shrubs, trees, or anything with an invasive root structure may not benefit from being grown in a wicking bed.

=== Salinity ===
There can be a build-up of salt in a wicking bed. They must be flushed from time to time. Well-constructed beds with a good drain typically get flushed or diluted in heavy rain, which is not usually an issue. However, in a long-term drought, it is important to flush through the water occasionally.

=== Anaerobic decomposition ===
It is important to build in an air gap in a wicking bed, between the water and the soil, with only 5-10% of the area crossing that boundary for wicking. This stops the soil from getting too sodden and helps prevent an odorous anaerobic decomposition from occurring. A badly constructed wicking bed may even have organic matter in the reservoir layer below the water line, which can trigger the same thing. The use of charcoal in the lower areas of the mix is recommended to keep the dam soil sweet.

=== Cost/Effort ===
No doubt it costs more up front to establish a wicking bed. However, the effort is generally returned in higher yields and much lower maintenance.
