= Sub-irrigated planter =

Type of gardening container

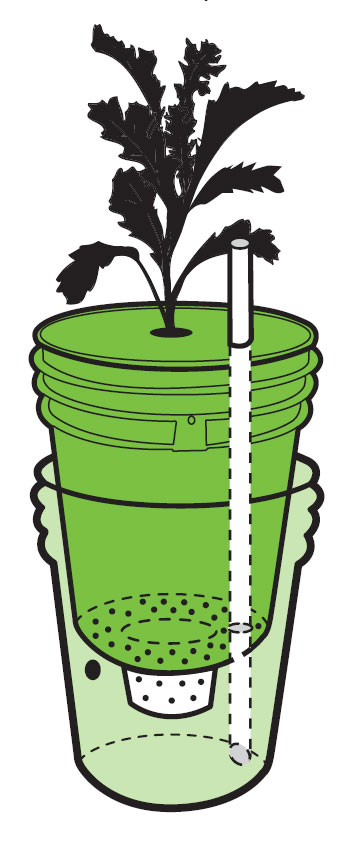
Sub-irrigated planter

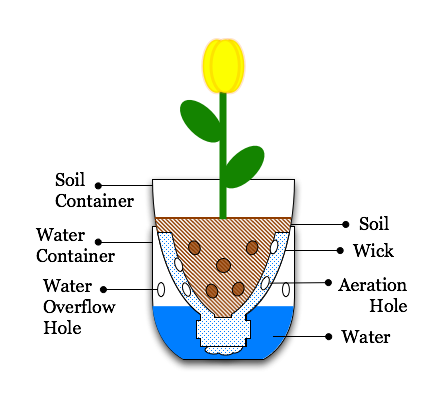
Diagram of a Two-liter bottle recycled into a sub-irrigated planter

Sub-irrigated planter (SIP) is a generic name for a special type of planting box used in container gardening and commercial landscaping. A SIP is any method of watering plants where the water is introduced from the bottom, allowing the water to soak upwards to the plant through capillary action. It is possible to automate the watering and thus SIPs are popular with professional landscapers in buildings or urban settings. Commercialized versions of a Sub-irrigated planter condenses humidity from the environment and feed it directly into the plants' roots. SIPs are available as commercial products or as do-it-yourself projects made from plastic buckets, boxes or storage totes. One of the disadvantages of such closed systems is that soluble salts cannot be flushed into the lower soil profile and build up over time.

== See also ==
- Subirrigation
- Wicking bed
