= BAITSSS =

- Developers: Ramesh Dhungel and group
- Written in: Python (programming language), shell script, GDAL, numpy
- Operating system: Microsoft Windows
- Type: Evapotranspiration modeling, irrigation simulation, surface temperature simulation, soil moisture simulation, Geographic information system

BAITSSS (Backward-Averaged Iterative Two-Source Surface temperature and energy balance Solution) is biophysical Evapotranspiration (ET) computer model that determines water use, primarily in agriculture landscape, using remote sensing-based information. It was developed and refined by Ramesh Dhungel and the water resources group at University of Idaho's Kimberly Research and Extension Center since 2010. It has been used in different areas in the United States including Southern Idaho, Northern California, northwest Kansas, Texas, and Arizona.

== History of development ==
BAITSSS originated from the research of Ramesh Dhungel, a graduate student at the University of Idaho, who joined a project called "Producing and integrating time series of gridded evapotranspiration for irrigation management, hydrology and remote sensing applications" under professor Richard G. Allen.

In 2012, the initial version of landscape model was developed using the Python IDLE environment using NARR weather data (~ 32 kilometers). Dhungel submitted his PhD dissertation in 2014 where the model was called BATANS (backward averaged two source accelerated numerical solution). The model was first published in Meteorological Applications journal in 2016 under the name BAITSSS as a framework to interpolate ET between the satellite overpass when thermal based surface temperature is unavailable. The overall concept of backward averaging was introduced to expedite the convergence process of iteratively solved surface energy balance components which can be time-consuming and can frequently suffer non-convergence, especially in low wind speed.

In 2017, the landscape BAITSSS model was scripted in Python shell, together with GDAL and NumPy libraries using NLDAS weather data (~ 12.5 kilometers). The detailed independent model was evaluated against weighing lysimeter measured ET, infrared temperature (IRT) and net radiometer of drought-tolerant corn and sorghum at Conservation and Production Research Laboratory in Bushland, Texas by group of scientists from USDA-ARS and Kansas State University between 2017 and 2020. Some later development of BAITSSS includes physically based crop productivity components, i.e. biomass and crop yield computation.

== Rationale ==
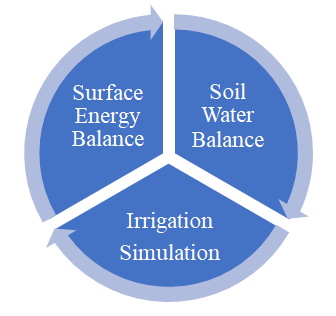
Major Components of BAITSSS ET Model

The majority of remote sensing based instantaneous ET models use evaporative fraction (EF) or reference ET fraction (ET_{r}F), similar to crop coefficients, for computing seasonal values, these models generally lack the soil water balance and Irrigation components in surface energy balance. Other limiting factors is the dependence on thermal-based radiometric surface temperature, which is not always available at required temporal resolution and frequently obscured by factors such as cloud cover. BAITSSS was developed to fill these gaps in remote sensing based models liberating the use of thermal-based radiometric surface temperature and to serve as a digital crop water tracker simulating high temporal (hourly or sub-hourly) and spatial resolution (30 meter) ET maps. BAITSSS utilizes remote sensing based canopy formation information, i.e. estimation of seasonal variation of vegetation indices and senescence.

== Approach and model structure ==
Surface energy balance is one of the commonly utilized approaches to quantify ET (latent heat flux in terms of flux), where weather variables and vegetation Indices are the drivers of this process. BAITSSS adopts numerous equations to compute surface energy balance and resistances where primarily are from Javis, 1976, Choudhury and Monteith, 1988, and aerodynamic methods or flux-gradient relationship equations with stability functions associated with Monin–Obukhov similarity theory.

=== Underlying fundamental equations of surface energy balance ===
Latent heat flux (LE)

The aerodynamic or flux-gradient equations of latent heat flux in BAITSSS are shown below. $e^{o}_c$ is saturation vapor pressure at the canopy and $e^{o}_s$ is for soil, $e_a$ is ambient vapor pressure, r_{ac} is bulk boundary layer resistance of vegetative elements in the canopy, r_{ah} is aerodynamic resistance between zero plane displacement (d) + roughness length of momentum (z_{om}) and measurement height (z) of wind speed, r_{as} is the aerodynamic resistance between the substrate and canopy height (d +z_{om}), and r_{ss} is soil surface resistance.

$LE_{c} = \frac{\rho_a c_{p} }{{\gamma}} \bigl(\frac{e^{o}_c - e_a }{{r_{ac} + r_{ah} + r_{sc}}}\bigr)\ \And \ LE_{s} = \frac{\rho_a c_{p} }{{\gamma}} \bigl(\frac{e^{o}_s - e_a }{{r_{as} + r_{ah} + r_{ss}}}\bigr)$

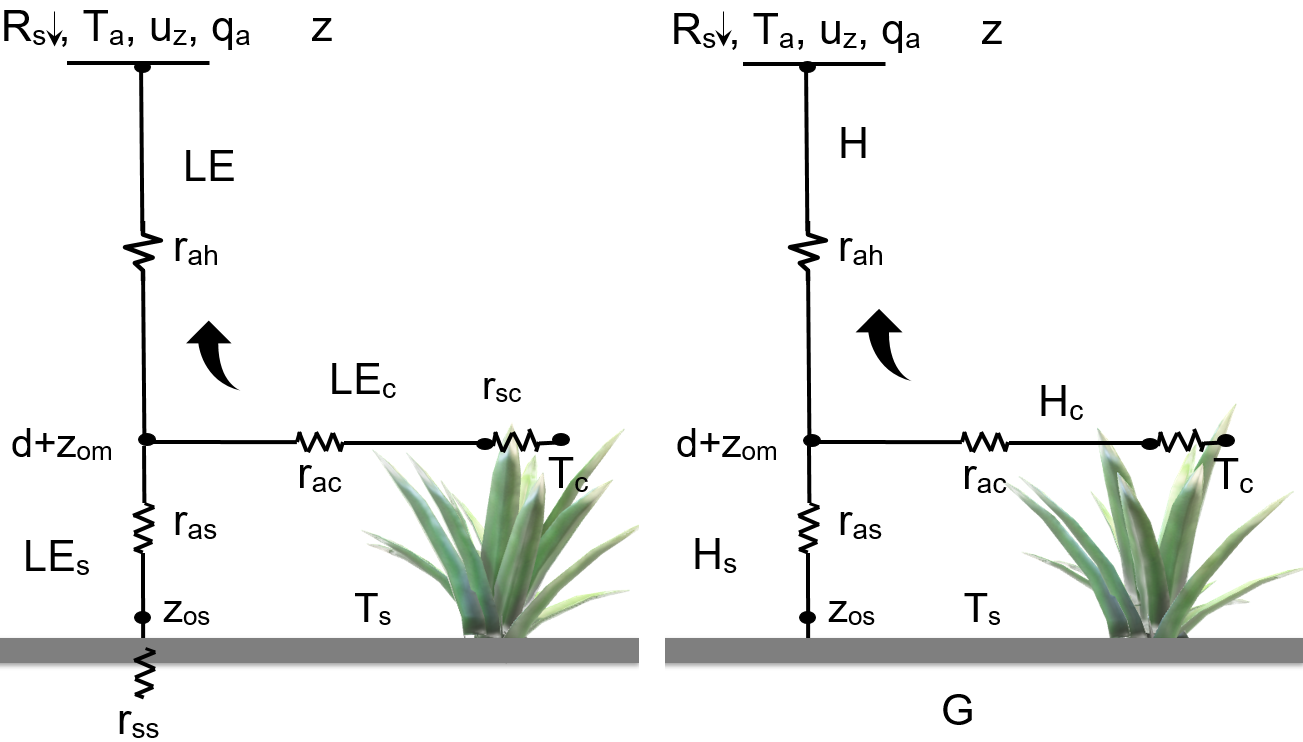
The schematic of BAITSSS latent heat flux (LE) and sensible heat flux (H) as electrical analogy showing various resistances (soil surface resistance : r_{ss} and canopy resistance: r_{sc}) and surface temperatures (canopy temperature: T_{c} and soil surface temperature: T_{s}).

Sensible heat flux (H) and surface temperature calculation

The flux-gradient equations of sensible heat flux and surface temperature in BAITSSS are shown below.

$H_{c} = {\rho_a c_{p} } \bigl(\frac{T_c - T_a }{{r_{ah} + r_{ac}}}\bigr)\Longleftrightarrow T_{c} = \frac{H_{c}(r_{ah} + r_{ac}) }{{\rho_a c_{p}}} + {T_a }$

$H_{s} = {\rho_a c_{p} } \bigl(\frac{T_s - T_a }{{r_{ah} + r_{as}}}\bigr)\Longleftrightarrow T_{s} = \frac{H_{s}(r_{ah} + r_{as}) }{{\rho_a c_{p}}} + {T_a }$

Canopy resistance (r_{sc})

Typical Jarvis type-equation of r_{sc} adopted in BAITSSS is shown below, R_{c-min} is the minimum value of r_{sc}, LAI is leaf area index, f_{c} is fraction of canopy cover, weighting functions representing plant response to solar radiation (F_{1}), air temperature (F_{2}), vapor pressure deficit (F_{3}), and soil moisture (F_{4}) each varying between 0 and 1.

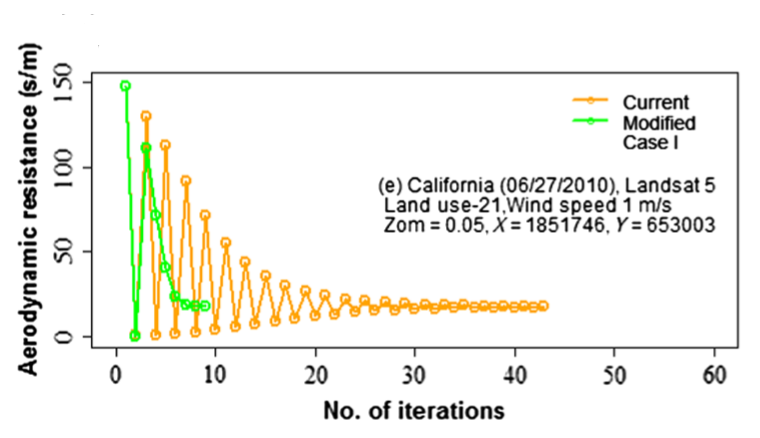
An illustration of convergence of aerodynamic resistance of surface energy balance from backward averaging (modified - green) compared to non-averaging (orange)

$r_{sc} = \frac{R_{c-min}}{\frac{LAI} {f_c} F_1 F_2 F_3 F_4 }$

=== Equations of soil water balance and irrigation decision ===
Standard soil water balance equations for soil surface and the root zone are implemented in BAITSSS for each time step, where irrigation decisions are based on the soil moisture at the root zone.

== Data ==
=== Input ===
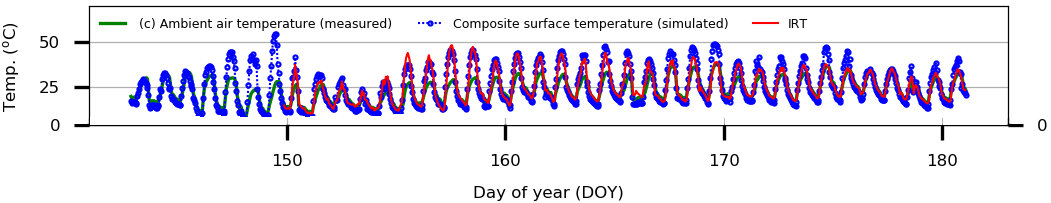
Hourly averaged iteratively solved surface temperature from BAITSSS (composite surface) compared to measured Infrared Temperature (IRT) and air temperature of corn between 22 May and 28 June 2016 near Bushland, Texas.

ET models, in general, need information about vegetation (physical properties and vegetation indices) and environment condition (weather data) to compute water use. Primary weather data requirements in BAITSSS are solar irradiance (R_{s↓}), wind speed (u_{z}), air temperature (T_{a}), relative humidity (RH) or specific humidity (q_{a}), and precipitation (P). Vegetation indices requirements in BAITSSS are leaf area index (LAI) and fractional canopy cover (f_{c}), generally estimated from normalized difference vegetation index (NDVI). Automated BAITSSS can compute ET throughout United States using National Oceanic and Atmospheric Administration (NOAA) weather data (i.e. hourly NLDAS: North American Land Data Assimilation system at 1/8 degree; ~ 12.5 kilometers), Vegetation indices those acquired by Landsat, and soil information from SSURGO.

=== Output ===
BAITSSS generates large numbers of variables (fluxes, resistances, and moisture) in gridded form in each time-step. The most commonly used outputs are evapotranspiration, evaporation, transpiration, soil moisture, irrigation amount, and surface temperature maps and time series analysis.

== Model features ==
Time series of BAITSSS simulated daily cumulative plots of corn a) transpiration (T), b) evaporation (E_{ss}), c) mean soil moisture at root zone (θ_{root}), d) mean soil moisture at surface (θ_{sur}), e) evapotranspiration (ET), f) gridded precipitation (P), and simulated irrigation (I_{rr}; bar plot) of sampled pixel at Sheridan 6 (SD-6) LEMA (100° 38′ 22″ W, 39° 21′ 38″ N) between May 10 and September 15, Kansas, United States. Shade represents 5-year maximum and minimum and the black line represents mean value.

Feature	Description
Two-source energy balance	BAITSSS is a two-source energy balance model (separate soil and canopy section) which is integrated by fraction of vegetation cover (f_{c}) based on vegetation indices.
Two-layers soil water balance	BAITSSS simulates soil surface moisture (θ_{sur}) and root zone moisture (θ_{root}) layers are related to the dynamics of evaporative (E_{ss}) and transpirative (T) flux. Capillary rise (CR) from the layer below root zone into the root zone layer is neglected. The soil moisture at both layers is restricted to field capacity (θ_{fc}).
Surface temperature	BAITSSS iteratively solves surface temperature inverting flux-gradient equations of H at the soil surface (subscript s) (T_{s}) and canopy level (subscript c) (T_{c}) for each time step using continuous weather variables and surface roughness defined by vegetation Indices.
Ground heat flux of soil	BAITSSS estimates ground heat flux (G) of soil surface based on sensible heat flux (H_{s}) or net radiation (R_{n_s}) of soil surface and neglects G on vegetated surface.
Transpiration	Variable canopy conductance in terms of canopy resistance (r_{sc}), based on the Jarvis-type algorithm is used to compute transpiration.
Evaporation	Evaporation (E_{ss}) in BAITSSS is computed based on soil resistance (r_{ss}) and soil water content in soil surface layer (upper 100 millimeters of soil water balance).
Irrigation	BAITSSS simulates irrigation (I_{rr}) in agricultural landscapes by mimicking a tipping-bucket approach (applied to surface as sprinkler or sub-surface layer as drip), using Management Allowed Depletion (MAD), and soil water content regimes at rooting depth (lower 100-2000 millimeters of soil layer).
Biomass and Yield	BAITSSS computes above biomass from transpiration efficiency normalized by vapor pressure deficit and grain fraction by empirical function of biomass.

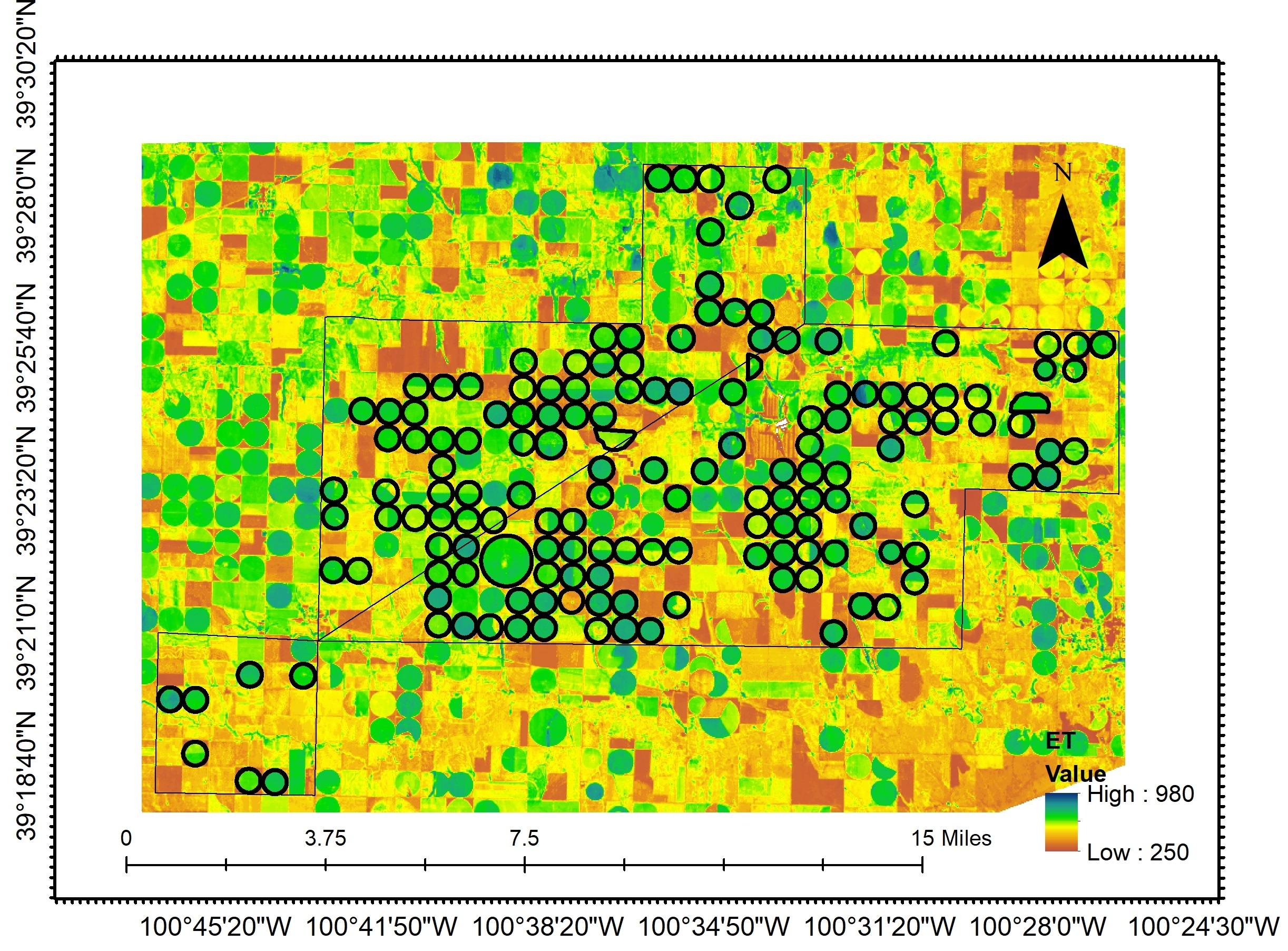
Digital agriculture-Simulated cumulative seasonal evapotranspiration (mm at 30 m spatial resolution) from hourly weather data from NLDAS and Vegetation Indices from Landsat using automated BAITSSS assuming 0.5 MAD between 10 May and 15 September 2013 for regulated groundwater management district; SD-6 LEMA, Kansas, United States (black circles, water rights shapes).

== Agriculture system applications and recognition ==
BAITSSS was implemented to compute ET in southern Idaho for 2008, and in northern California for 2010. It was used to calculate corn and sorghum ET in Bushland, Texas for 2016, and multiple crops in northwest Kansas for 2013–2017. BAITSSS has been widely discussed among the peers around the world, including Bhattarai et al. in 2017 and Jones et al. in 2019. United States Senate Committee on Agriculture, Nutrition and Forestry listed BAITSSS in its climate change report. BAITSSS was also covered by articles in Open Access Government, Landsat science team, Grass & Grain magazine, National Information Management & Support System (NIMSS), terrestrial ecological models, key research contribution related to sensible heat flux estimation and irrigation decision in remote sensing based ET models.

In September 2019, the Northwest Kansas Groundwater Management District 4 (GMD 4) along with BAITSSS received national recognition from American Association for the Advancement of Science (AAAS). AAAS highlighted 18 communities across the U.S. that are responding to climate change including Sheridan County, Kansas to prolong the life of Ogallala Aquifer by minimizing water use where this aquifer is depleting rapidly due to extensive agricultural practices . AAAS discussed the development and use of intricate ET model BAITSSS and Dhungel's and other scientists efforts supporting effective use of water in Sheridan County, Kansas.

Furthermore, Upper Republican Regional Advisory Committee of Kansas (June 2019) and GMD 4 discussed possible benefit and utilization of BAITSSS for managing water use, educational purpose, and cost-share. A short story about Ogallala Aquifer Conservation effort from Kansas State University and GMD4 using ET model was published in Mother Earth News (April/May 2020), and Progressive Crop Consultant.

== Example application ==
=== Groundwater and Irrigation ===
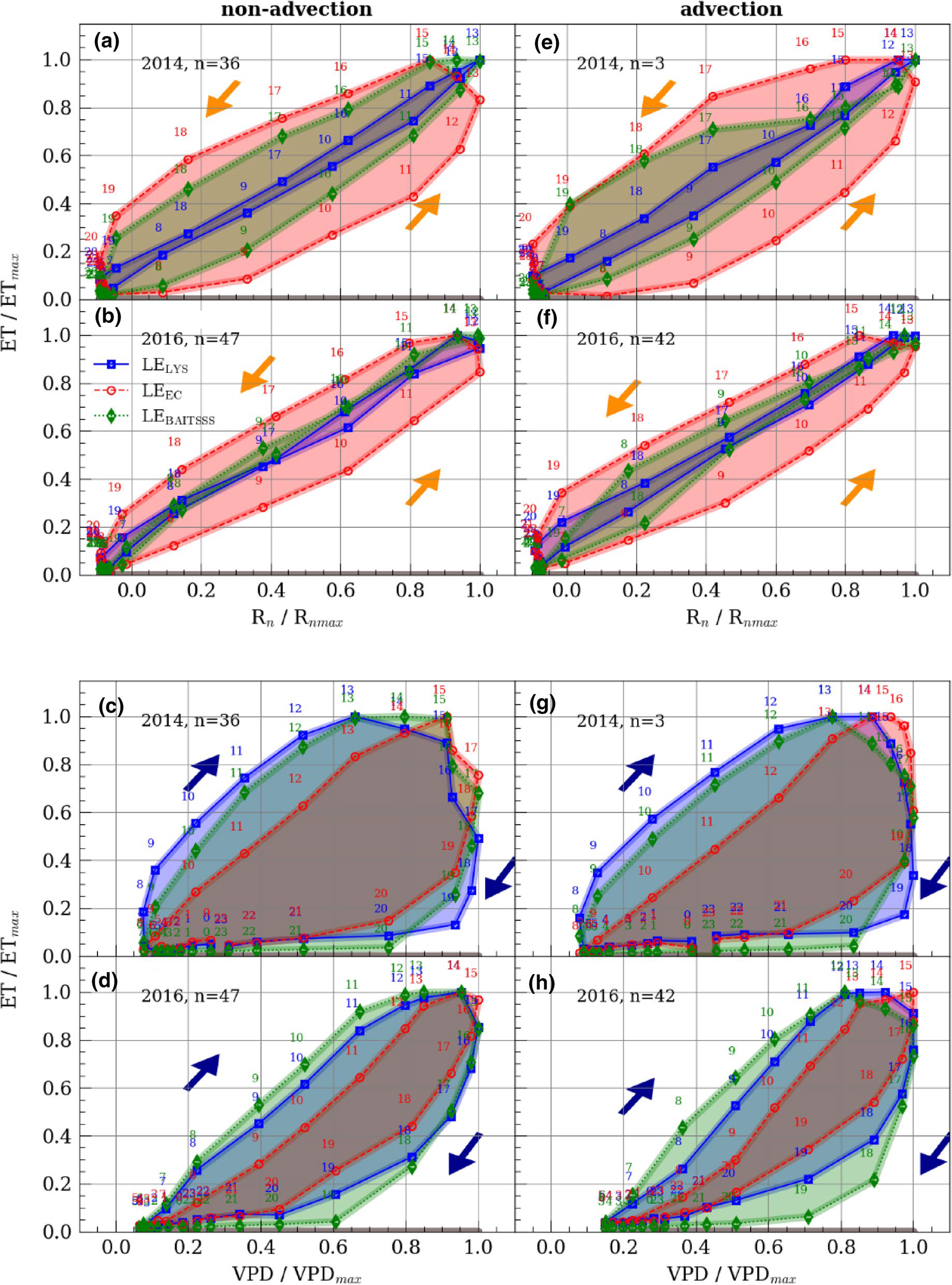
Averaged evapotranspiration hysteresis between normalized evapotranspiration (ET) and normalized net radiation (Rn) and normalized water vapor pressure deficit (VPD).

Dhungel et al., 2020, combined with field crop scientists, systems analysts, and district water managers, applied BAITSSS at the district water management level focusing on seasonal ET and annual groundwater withdrawal rates at Sheridan 6 (SD-6) Local Enhanced Management Plan (LEMA) for five years period (2013–2017) in northwest, Kansas, United States. BAITSSS simulated irrigation was compared to reported irrigation as well as to infer deficit irrigation within water right management units (WRMU). In Kansas, groundwater pumping records are legal documents and maintained by the Kansas Division of Water Resources. The in-season water supply was compared to BAITSSS simulated ET as well-watered crop water condition.

=== Evapotranspiration Hysterisis and Advection ===
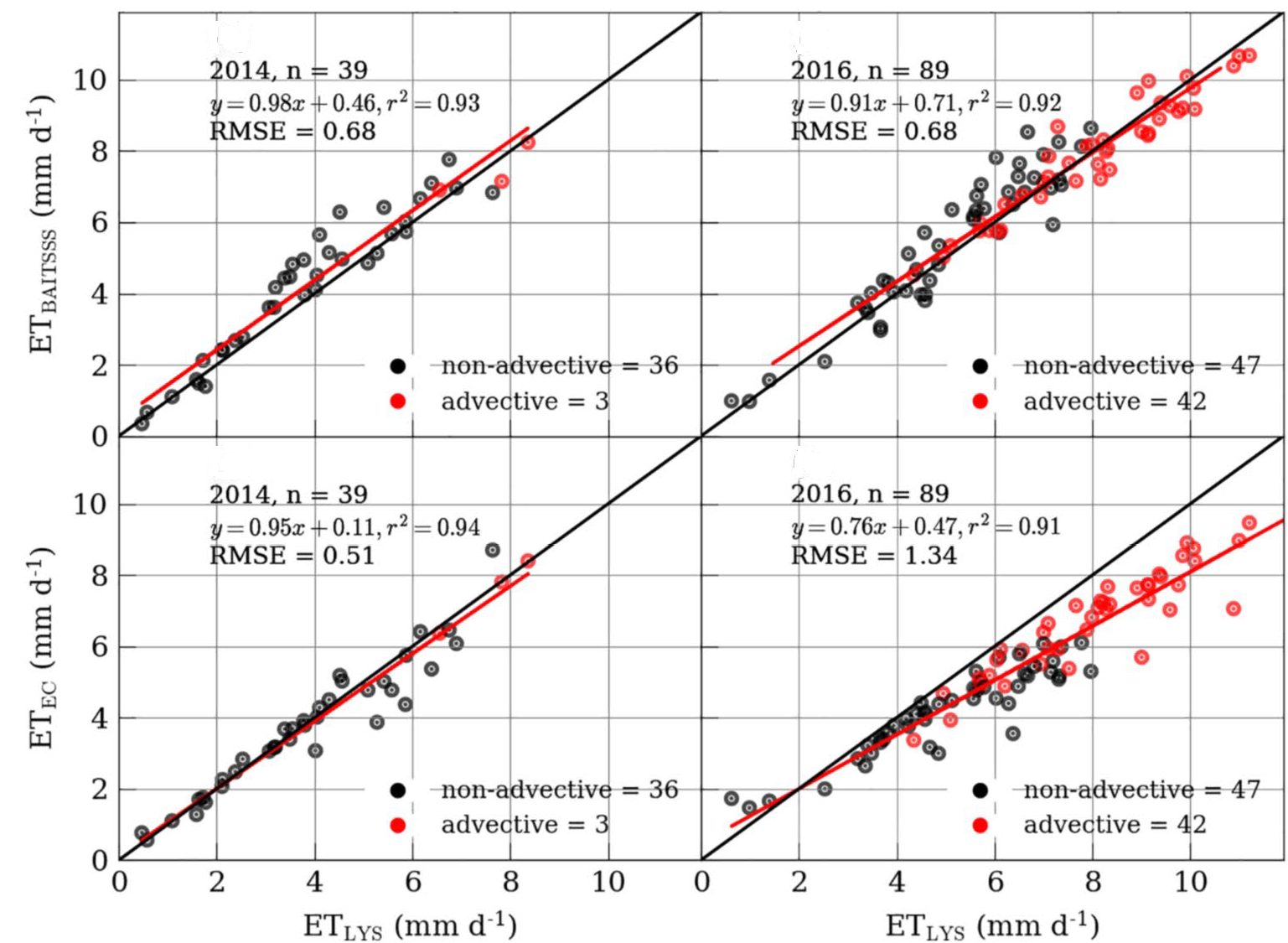
Daily evapotranspiration uncertainties. The lysimeter measurements were taken as references. Linear regressions are red lines and one-to-one lines are black.

A study related to ET uncertainty associated with ET hysteresis (Vapor pressure and net radiation) were conducted using lysimeter, Eddy covariance (EC), and BAITSSS model (point-scale) in an advective environment of Bushland, Texas. Results indicated that the pattern of hysteresis from BAITSSS closely followed the lysimeter and showed weak hysteresis related to net radiation when compared to EC. However, both lysimeter and BAITSSS showed strong hysteresis related to VPD when compared to EC.

=== Lettuce Evapotranspiration ===
A study related to lettuce evapotranspiration was conducted at Yuma, Arizona using BAITSSS between 2016 and 2020, where model simulated ET closely followed twelve eddy covariance sites

=== Challenges and limitations ===
Simulation of hourly ET at 30 m spatial resolution for seasonal time scale is computationally challenging and data-intensive. The low wind speed complicates the convergence of surface energy balance components as well. The peer group Pan et al. in 2017 and Dhungel et al., 2019 pointed out the possible difficulty of parameterization and validations of these kinds of resistance based models. The simulated irrigation may vary than that actually applied in field.

== BAITSSS Desktop V1 ==
BAITSSS Desktop V1 is a redevelopment of the earlier research-code version of BAITSSS as a Windows application. The scientific model remains at its core, but the software around it has been reorganized into a more defined architecture for data, model execution, project state, and results. Earlier script-based processing and repeated file handling have been replaced in several parts by shared runtime components and in-memory processing, while the scientific engine is kept separate from the desktop interface. Projects now provide a persistent structure for inputs, settings, runs, recovery, and outputs rather than managing these through separate scripts and folders. This makes repeated model runs easier to manage, reduces unnecessary processing, and provides a clearer structure for maintaining the software without mixing interface changes with scientific calculations. From the desktop, a user can define or import an AOI, set the simulation period, prepare and check the required data, run or resume the model, view maps and pixel time series, and export results within the same project.

BAITSSS Desktop V1 Project Overview

== See also ==
- METRIC, another model developed by University of Idaho that uses Landsat satellite data to compute and map evapotranspiration
- SEBAL, uses the surface energy balance to estimate aspects of the hydrological cycle. SEBAL maps evapotranspiration, biomass growth, water deficit and soil moisture
