= Thornthwaite (disambiguation) =

Thornthwaite is a village in Cumbria, England.

Thornthwaite may also refer to

- Thornthwaite, North Yorkshire, England
- C. W. Thornthwaite (1899-1963), American geographer
- Thornthwaite climate classification (Climate classification system created by American climatologist C. W. Thornthwaite)
- Jane Thornthwaite, Canadian politician
