= Penman equation =

Equation describing evaporation

The Penman equation describes evaporation (E) from an open water surface, and was developed by Howard Penman in 1948. Penman's equation requires daily mean temperature, wind speed, air pressure, and solar radiation to predict E. Simpler Hydrometeorological equations continue to be used where obtaining such data is impractical, to give comparable results within specific contexts, e.g. humid vs arid climates.

== Details ==
Numerous variations of the Penman equation are used to estimate evaporation from water, and land. Specifically the Penman–Monteith equation refines weather based potential evapotranspiration (PET) estimates of vegetated land areas. It is widely regarded as one of the most accurate models, in terms of estimates.

The original equation was developed by Howard Penman at the Rothamsted Experimental Station, Harpenden, UK.

The equation for evaporation given by Penman is:

$$E_{\mathrm{mass}}=\frac{m R_n + \rho_a c_p \left(\delta e \right) g_a }{\lambda_v \left(m + \gamma \right) }$$

where:

m = Slope of the saturation vapor pressure curve (Pa K^{−1})
R_{n} = Net irradiance (W m^{−2})
ρ_{a} = density of air (kg m^{−3})
c_{p} = heat capacity of air (J kg^{−1} K^{−1})
δe = vapor pressure deficit (Pa)
g_{a} = momentum surface aerodynamic conductance (m s^{−1})
λ_{v} = latent heat of vaporization (J kg^{−1})
γ = psychrometric constant (Pa K^{−1})

which (if the SI units in parentheses are used) will give the evaporation E_{mass} in units of kg/(m^{2}·s), kilograms of water evaporated every second for each square meter of area.

Remove λ to obviate that this is fundamentally an energy balance. Replace λ_{v} with L to get familiar precipitation units ET_{vol}, where L_{v}=λ_{v}ρ_{water}. This has units of m/s, or more commonly mm/day, because it is flux m^{3}/s per m^{2}=m/s.

This equation assumes a daily time step so that net heat exchange with the ground is insignificant, and a unit area surrounded by similar open water or vegetation so that net heat & vapor exchange with the surrounding area cancels out. Some times people replace R_{n} with and A for total net available energy when a situation warrants account of additional heat fluxes.

Temperature, wind speed, relative humidity impact the values of m, g, c_{p}, ρ, and δe.

== Shuttleworth (1993) ==
In 1993, W.Jim Shuttleworth modified and adapted the Penman equation to use SI, which made calculating evaporation simpler. The resultant equation is:

$$E_{\mathrm{mass}}=\frac{m R_n + \gamma * 6.43\left(1+0.536 * U_2 \right)\delta e}{\lambda_v \left(m + \gamma \right) }$$

where:

E_{mass} = Evaporation rate (mm day^{−1})
m = Slope of the saturation vapor pressure curve (kPa K^{−1})
R_{n} = Net irradiance (MJ m^{−2} day^{−1})
γ = psychrometric constant = $\frac{0.0016286 * P_{kPa}} {\lambda_v}$ (kPa K^{−1})
U_{2} = wind speed (m s^{−1})
δe = vapor pressure deficit (kPa)
λ_{v} = latent heat of vaporization (MJ kg^{−1})

== Some useful relationships ==
δe = (e_{s} - e_{a}) = (1 – relative humidity) e_{s}
e_{s} = saturated vapor pressure of air, as is found inside plant stoma.
e_{a} = vapor pressure of free flowing air.
e_{s}, mmHg = exp(21.07-5336/T_{a}), approximation by Merva, 1975

Therefore $m= \Delta =\frac{d e_s}{d T_a} = \frac{5336}{T_a^2} e^{\left(21.07 - \frac{5336}{T_a}\right)}$, mmHg/K

T_{a} = air temperature in kelvins

== See also ==
- Pan evaporation
- Evapotranspiration
- Thornthwaite model
- Blaney–Criddle equation
- Penman–Monteith equation
