= John Monteith =

British scientist (1929–2012)

- A portrait of John Lennox Monteith (date unknown)
- Born: John Lennox Monteith; 3 September 1929
- Died: 20 July 2012 (aged 82)
- Known for: Application of physics in biology
- Awards: FRS (1971), FRSE (1972)

John Lennox Monteith DSc, FRS (3 September 1929 – 20 July 2012) was a British scientist who pioneered the application of physics to biology. He was an authority in the related fields of water management for agricultural production, soil physics, micrometeorology, transpiration, and the influence of the natural environment on field crops, horticultural crops, forestry, and animal production.

== Research ==
His pioneering work with Howard Penman on evapotranspiration is applied worldwide as the Penman-Monteith equation. It predicts evapotranspiration and is recommended by the Food and Agriculture Organization for calculating irrigation quantities. Monteith's research on the role of the environment in agriculture, the physics of crop microclimate, physiology of crop growth and yield, radiation climatology, heat balance in animals, and instrumentation for measuring physical and physiological variables in agriculture has been published in journals throughout the world.

He was President of the Royal Meteorological Society from 1978 to 1980. In his presidential address in 1980 he advised colleagues that unless they could understand how crop yields were determined by weather events, they would have little hope of predicting how crop yields would vary as a result of global warming and elevated CO_{2} levels.

When he retired in 1992 a conference on resource capture by crops was organised and a further conference was held in 2008. The American Society of Agronomy also organised a symposium in his honour in 1996. In an obituary by researchers at Nottingham it was noted it was "impossible to quantify" the impact of his research but that his influence was major judging by the large number of researchers that he supervised who held senior positions in organisations around the world.

== Career ==
- 1954 Rothamsted Experimental Station, Harpenden, Herts, UK
- 1967 University of Nottingham, School of Agriculture, UK
- 1987 International Crops Research Institute for the Semi-Arid Tropics, Hyderabad, India
- Senior visiting fellow of NERC.

== Awards and honours ==
- Elected Fellow of the Royal Society, 1971
- Elected Fellow of the Royal Society of Edinburgh, 1972
- Awarded Rank Prize for Human and Animal Nutrition and Crop Husbandry, 1989 for "his elucidation of the physical control of determining crop growth."
- Honorary Doctor of Science, University of Edinburgh, 1989
- Symons Gold Medal of the Royal Meteorological Society, 1994

His nomination for the Royal Society reads:

Dr. Monteith has made outstanding contributions to knowledge and understanding of the micro-climatology of field crops. In the physics, he has achieved complete energy, water, and carbon dioxide balances; in the biology, he has linked transpiration, assimilation and respiration rates with stomatal responses to light intensity, leaf orientation, ventilation and soil water stress. His early work on the physics of dew is unlikely to be superseded: his radiation studies embrace a survey for the British Isles down to the attenuation and spectral changes as sunlight filters through a crop canopy. He has been highly successful in devising or improving apparatus, and he has added much to the concept of "potential photosynthesis" as a measure of how a plant ought to grow in a given environment. In the application of physical principles to plant ecology he has few peers, and is an acknowledged leader in this aspect of crop meteorology.
