= Thornthwaite climate classification =

Climate classification system

The Thornthwaite climate classification is a climate classification system created by American climatologist Charles Warren Thornthwaite in 1931 and modified in 1948.

== 1931 classification ==
Precipitation effectiveness
| Humidity province | Vegetation | P/E Criteria |
|---|---|---|
| A (Wet) | Rainforest | P/E ≥ 128 |
| B (Humid) | Forest | 64 ≤ P/E < 128 |
| C (Subhumid) | Grassland | 32 ≤ P/E < 64 |
| D (Semiarid) | Steppe | 16 ≤ P/E < 32 |
| E (Arid) | Desert | P/E < 16 |

Temperature efficiency
| Thermal province | I' Criteria |
|---|---|
| A (Tropical) | T-E ≥ 128 |
| B (Mesothermal) | 64 ≤ T-E < 128 |
| C (Microthermal) | 32 ≤ T-E < 64 |
| D (Taiga) | 16 ≤ T-E < 32 |
| E (Tundra) | 0 < T-E < 16 |
| E (Frost) | T-E = 0 |

=== Precipitation effectiveness ===
Thornthwaite initially divided climates based on five types of vegetation: rainforest, forest, grassland, steppe, and desert. He posited that one of the main factors for the local vegetation is precipitation, but most importantly, precipitation effectiveness—that is to say how much moisture a plant receives relative to what it needs. Thornthwaite based the effectiveness of precipitation on an index, $P/E$, which is the sum of the 12 monthly P/E ratios. The monthly P/E ratios can be calculated using the formula:

$P/E_m = \frac{\text{total monthly precipitation}}{\text{monthly evapotranspiration}}$

=== Temperature efficiency ===
Similarly to precipitation effectiveness, Thornthwaite also developed an index to represent thermal efficiency, featuring six climate provinces: tropical, mesothermal, microthermal, taiga, tundra and frost.

The thermal efficiency index, $I'$, is the sum of the 12 monthly thermal efficiency ratios $i_m$, which can be calculated as:

$i'_m = \frac{t-32}{4}$, where $t$ is the mean monthly temperature in °F (set to 32 if below 32).

== 1948 modification ==
After being criticized for the empirical basis of his previous climate classification on vegetation, making it unnecessarily complex, Thornthwaite drew away from vegetation as a defining criterion and introduced the concept of potential evapotranspiration (PET), which both represents thermal efficiency and is ultimately used for the computation of precipitation effectiveness as indicated by the moisture index. He calculated PET using his own 1948 equation.

Thornthwaite developed four indices: the Moisture Index $I_m$, the aridity and humidity indexes ($I_a$ and $I_h$), the Thermal Efficiency Index ($TE$) and the Summer Concentration of Thermal Efficiency ($s\text{ or }SCTE$). Each of the four are ascribed a letter of the English alphabet. The order, in which the class-denoting letters follow, varies. Thornthwaite himself used “moisture type–thermal efficiency type–moisture seasonality–summer concentration type” (e.g., C_{2}B’_{2}rb’_{2} for Manhattan, KS, a moist subhumid, second mesothermal climate with little water deficiency and a temperature-efficiency regime normal to second mesothermal). In Latin America, where the classification is sometimes employed, the first two letters are used to describe the precipitation pattern and the last two are used to describe the thermal regime. For example, Tracuateua, B_{3}s2A’b’_{4}, features a humid (B_{3}) megathermal (A’) climate with a large summer water deficit (s_{2}) and in which between 48% and 52% of potential evapotranspiration occurs in the summer (b’_{4}).

=== Moisture Index ===
Moisture index (Im)
| I_{m} Class | Subclass | I_{m} Criteria |
|---|---|---|
| A (Perhumid) | A | Im ≥ 100 |
| B (Humid) | B_{4} | 80 ≤ Im < 100 |
| B (Humid) | B_{3} | 60 ≤ Im <80 |
| B (Humid) | B_{2} | 40 ≤ Im < 60 |
| B (Humid) | B_{1} | 20 ≤ Im < 40 |
| C (Subhumid) | C_{2} (Moist subhumid) | 0 ≤ Im < 20 |
| C (Subhumid) | C_{1} (Dry subhumid) | -20 ≤ Im < 0 |
| D (Semiarid) | D | -40 ≤ Im < -20 |
| E (Arid) | E | -60 ≤ Im < -40 |

Thermal Efficiency Index
| Class | Subclass | Annual PET (mm) |
|---|---|---|
| A (Megathermal) | A’ | PET ≥ 1140 |
| B (Mesothermal) | B’_{4} | 1140 > PET ≥ 997 |
| B (Mesothermal) | B’_{3} | 997 > PET ≥ 885 |
| B (Mesothermal) | B’_{2} | 885 > PET ≥ 712 |
| B (Mesothermal) | B’_{1} | 712 > PET ≥ 570 |
| C (Microthermal) | C’_{2} | 570 > PET ≥ 427 |
| C (Microthermal) | C’_{1} | 427 > PET ≥ 285 |
| D (Tundra) | D’ | 285 > PET ≥ 142 |
| E (Frost) | E’ | PET < 142 |

Summer Concentration of Thermal Efficiency
| Class | Subclass | SCTE (%) |
|---|---|---|
| a | a’ | SCTE < 48 |
| b | b’_{4} | 48 ≤ SCTE < 52 |
| b | b’_{3} | 52 ≤ SCTE < 56.3 |
| b | b’_{2} | 56.3 ≤ SCTE < 61.6 |
| b | b’_{1} | 61.6 ≤ SCTE < 68 |
| c | c’_{2} | 68 ≤ SCTE < 76.3 |
| c | c’_{1} | 76.3 ≤ SCTE < 88 |
| d | d’ | SCTE ≥ 88 |

The Moisture Index (Im) expresses the overall moisture of an environment and is directly obtained from the aridity and humidity indexes. If there is excess water in one season, it will be stored in the soil and may be used by plants in another when moisture is deficient (provided that the roots are deep enough to reach it), thus offsetting the effects of drought. Thornthwaite found that every six inches of water surplus counteract a water deficiency of ten and devised a composite index that reflects this.

This index can be calculated as $I_m = I_h - 0.6 \cdot I_a$, where Ih and Ia are the humidity and aridity indices, respectively.

=== Seasonal Variation of Effective Moisture ===
The Seasonal Variation of Effective Moisture is described by two indexes: The Aridity Index (I_{a}), used in wet climates to identify and quantify the severity of drought conditions, and the Humidity Index (I_{h}), used in dry climates to identify and quantify the severity of wet conditions. These indexes are represented by the equations:

$\mathit{I_a} = \left( \frac{D}{\mathit{PET}} \right) \cdot 100$,

$\mathit{I_h} = \left( \frac{S}{\mathit{PET}} \right) \cdot 100$, where D is the annual water deficit, S is the annual water surplus, and PET is the annual potential evapotranspiration

Furthermore, these indices are represented by four letters, which indicate the seasonal distribution of precipitation: r (continuously wet), d (continuously dry), s (summer is the driest season) and w (winter is the driest season), subscripted with a _{2} where needed, to indicate severity.

Moist climates (A, B, C_{2}) can be classified as:

- r (little or no water deficiency): 0 ≤ I_{a} < 16.7
- s (moderate summer water deficiency): 16.7 ≤ I_{a} < 33.3 and the deficit in the summer is larger than in the winter
- w (moderate winter water deficiency): 16.7 ≤ I_{a} < 33.3 and the deficit in the winter is larger than in the summer
- s_{2} (large summer water deficiency): I_{a} ≥ 33.3 and the deficit in the summer is larger than in the winter
- w_{2} (large winter water deficiency): I_{a} ≥ 33.3 and the deficit in the winter is larger than in the summer

Dry climates (C_{1}, D, E) can be classified as:

- d (little or no water surplus): 0 ≤ I_{h} < 10
- s (moderate winter water surplus): 10 ≤ I_{h} < 20 and the surplus in the summer is larger than in the winter
- w (moderate summer water surplus): 10 ≤ I_{h} < 20 and the surplus in the winter is larger than in the summer
- s_{2} (large winter water surplus): I_{h} ≥ 33.3 and the surplus in the summer is larger than in the winter
- w_{2} (large summer water surplus): I_{h} ≥ 33.3 and the surplus in the winter is larger than in the summer

The deficiency of water in the soil is calculated as the difference between the potential evapotranspiration and the actual evapotranspiration.

=== Thermal efficiency ===
The thermal efficiency index (TE) is defined as the annual potential evapotranspiration (PET) and is broken down into five types: megathermal, mesothermal, microthermal, tundra, and perpetual frost.

=== Summer Concentration of Thermal Efficiency ===
The Summer Concentration of Thermal Efficiency (SCTE) is a measure of how high latitude a climate is and if the summers are the only season conducive to plant growth. If it is high, that means most of the potential evapotranspiration occurs in the summer, as it is the only season with solar radiation and temperatures high enough to allow for evapotranspiration while the others are too cold. Conversely, in equatorial climates summer evapotranspiration accounts for roughly 25% of the annual value because the weather is equally conducive to plant growth year round. Summer concentration of thermal efficiency is calculated as follows:
$\mathit{SCTE} = \left( \frac{\mathit{PET_1}+\mathit{PET_2}+\mathit{PET_3}}{\mathit{PET_a}} \right) \cdot 100$, where $PET_1$, $PET_2$, and $PET_3$ are the estimated values of PET for the three warmest consecutive months and $PET_a$ is the annual value.
