= Howard Penman =

Howard Latimer Penman (1909 – 1984) was a British meteorologist. He formulated Penman’s Formula, which is used worldwide by meteorologists and agricultural scientists to assess evaporation rates in different setups (lakes and ponds, lawns, cropped fields) and locations in the world. With John Monteith he formulated the Penman–Monteith equation which is used to calculate evapotranspiration and the need for crop irrigation. Penman was a distinguished Rothamsted Research scientist and government advisor, and a well-known local figure in Harpenden.

== Early life ==
Howard Penman was born in County Durham and studied at Durham University where he graduated in Physics in 1930. While working for the British Cotton Research Association in Manchester he worked on his thesis for his Ph.D., which was awarded by Durham University in 1938. Bored by the work on cotton dyes he applied in 1937 for a post in the Soil Physics Department at Rothamsted Research, headed by Bernard Keen, for a salary of £320 per annum. He became interested in the records of the drain gauges, and their relationship with rainfall, and from these was able to estimate the rate at which water evaporated from bare soil. From these beginnings some of his major contributions would follow. When war broke out he was recruited by the Admiralty and worked on the sound output of ships and submarines in connection with the development of acoustic mines. In 1944 he was recalled to Rothamsted to work on the physics of wet soil in preparation for the land campaign, where the progress of military vehicles would be vital.

== Career ==
After the war he continued work on water-related topics, including irrigation needs worldwide, and seasonal water balances for each catchment area in Britain. R.K. Schofield succeeded Bernard Keen in 1947, but in 1954 Schofield became head of the Chemistry Department and Penman was appointed head of the separate Physics Department. Several members of his staff were involved in meteorological projects in Africa, and scientists came to be trained before taking posts in Nigeria, Kenya and Uganda and elsewhere, working on the needs of tropical crops. In 1961 he served as President of the Royal Meteorological Society, and he was elected Fellow of the Royal Society in 1965. He served on many academic and government bodies, and travelled widely, advising on reservoir projects and water needs, and was awarded the O.B.E. He retired from Rothamsted in 1974, but continued to take an interest in scientific and international issues until his death in 1984.

== Writings ==
Besides his work Penman also used to write humorous and satirical sketches. As a person he had a keen intellect and questioning temperament, but a fine sense of humour which showed itself in many ways, such as at the Christmas pantomimes at Rothamsted where he wrote some of the satirical sketches.

== Contribution ==
With his wife Nan he was very much involved with the United Nations Association and the need for international cooperation to solve the long term problems of peace and development. John Monteith in his Royal Society obituary article wrote: “By showing how classical physics can be used to solve environmental problems, Howard Penman made a unique contribution to agricultural meteorology and hydrology. His finest memorial is the formula which bears his name.”
