= Potential evapotranspiration =

Amount of evaporation

This animation shows the projected increase in potential evaporation in North America through the year 2100, relative to 1980, based on the combined results of multiple climate models.

Potential evapotranspiration (PET) or potential evaporation (PE) is the amount of water that would be evaporated and transpired by a specific crop, soil or ecosystem if there was sufficient water available. It is a reflection of the energy available to evaporate or transpire water, and of the wind available to transport the water vapor from the ground up into the lower atmosphere and away from the initial location. Potential evapotranspiration is expressed in terms of a depth of water or soil moisture percentage.

If the actual evapotranspiration (AET) is considered the net result of atmospheric demand for moisture from a surface and the ability of the surface to supply moisture, then PET is a measure of the demand side (also called evaporative demand). Surface and air temperatures, insolation, and wind all affect this. A dryland is a place where annual potential evaporation exceeds annual precipitation.

Often a value for the potential evapotranspiration is calculated at a nearby climatic station on a reference surface, conventionally on land dominated by short grass (though this may differ from station to station). This value is called the reference evapotranspiration (ET_{0}). Actual evapotranspiration is said to equal potential evapotranspiration when there is ample water present. Evapotranspiration can never be greater than potential evapotranspiration, but can be lower if there is not enough water to be evaporated or plants are unable to transpire maturely and readily. Some US states utilize a full cover alfalfa reference crop that is 0.5 m (1.6 ft) in height, rather than the general short green grass reference, due to the higher value of ET from the alfalfa reference.

Potential evapotranspiration is higher in the summer, on clearer and less cloudy days, and closer to the equator, because of the higher levels of solar radiation that provides the energy (heat) for evaporation. Potential evapotranspiration is also higher on windy days because the evaporated moisture can be quickly moved from the ground or plant surface before it precipitates, allowing more evaporation to fill its place.

== Measurements ==
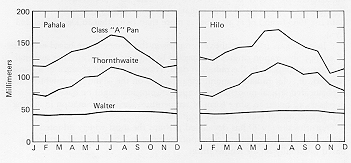
Monthly estimated potential evapotranspiration and measured pan evaporation for two locations in Hawaii, Hilo and Pahala

Potential evapotranspiration is usually measured indirectly, from other climatic factors, but also depends on the surface type, such as free water (for lakes and oceans), the soil type for bare soil, and also the density and diversity of vegetation. Often a value for the potential evapotranspiration is calculated at a nearby climate station on a reference surface, conventionally on short grass. This value is called the reference evapotranspiration, and can be converted to a potential evapotranspiration by multiplying by a surface coefficient. In agriculture, this is called a crop coefficient. The difference between potential evapotranspiration and actual precipitation is used in irrigation scheduling.

Average annual potential evapotranspiration is often compared to average annual precipitation, the symbol for which is P. The ratio of the two, P/PET, is the aridity index. A humid subtropical climate is a zone of climate with hot and humid summers, and cold to mild winters. Subarctic regions, between 50°N and 70°N latitude, have short, mild summers and freezing winters depending on local climates. Precipitation and evapotranspiration is low (compared to warmer variants), and vegetation is characteristic of the coniferous/taiga forest.

== Estimates of potential evaporation ==
=== Thornthwaite equation (1948) ===
$PET = 16 \left(\frac{L}{12}\right) \left(\frac{N}{30}\right) \left(\frac{10T_d}{I}\right)^{\alpha}$

Where

$PET$ is the estimated potential evapotranspiration (mm/month)

$T_d$ is the average daily temperature (degrees Celsius; if this is negative, use $0$) of the month being calculated

$N$ is the number of days in the month being calculated

$L$ is the average day length (hours) of the month being calculated

$\alpha = (6.75 \times 10^{-7}) I^3 - (7.71 \times 10^{-5}) I^2 + (1.792 \times 10^{-2}) I + 0.49239$

$I = \sum_{i=1}^{12} \left(\frac{T_{m_{i}}}{5}\right)^{1.514}$ is a heat index which depends on the 12 monthly mean temperatures $T_{m_{i}}$.

Somewhat modified forms of this equation appear in later publications (1955 and 1957) by C. W. Thornthwaite and Mather.

=== Penman equation (1948) ===
The Penman equation describes evaporation (E) from an open water surface, and was developed by Howard Penman in 1948. Penman's equation requires daily mean temperature, wind speed, air pressure, and solar radiation to predict E. Simpler Hydrometeorological equations continue to be used where obtaining such data is impractical, to give comparable results within specific contexts, e.g. humid vs arid climates.

=== FAO 56 Penman–Monteith equation (1998) ===
The Penman–Monteith equation refines weather based evapotranspiration (ET) estimates of vegetated land areas. This equation was then derived by FAO for retrieving the potential evapotranspiration ET_{0}. It is widely regarded as one of the most accurate models, in terms of estimates.

$$ET_0 = \frac{0.408 \Delta (R_n-G) + \frac{900}{T} \gamma u_2 \delta e }{\Delta + \gamma (1 + 0.34 u_2)}$$

ET_{0} = Potential evapotranspiration, Water volume evapotranspired (mm day^{−1})
Δ = Rate of change of saturation specific humidity with air temperature. (Pa K^{−1})
R_{n} = Net irradiance (MJ m^{−2} day^{−1}), the external source of energy flux
G = Ground heat flux (MJ m^{−2} day^{−1}), usually equivalent to zero on a day
T = Air temperature at 2m height (K)
u_{2} = Wind speed at 2m height (m s^{−1})
δe = Vapor pressure deficit (kPa)
γ = Psychrometric constant (γ ≈ 66 Pa K^{−1})

N.B.: The coefficients 0.408 and 900 are not unitless but account for the conversion from energy values to equivalent water depths: radiation [mm day^{−1}] = 0.408 radiation [MJ m^{−2} day^{−1}].

=== Priestley–Taylor equation ===
The Priestley–Taylor equation was developed as a substitute to the Penman–Monteith equation to remove dependence on observations. For Priestley–Taylor, only radiation (irradiance) observations are required. This is done by removing the aerodynamic terms from the Penman–Monteith equation and adding an empirically derived constant factor, $\alpha$.

The underlying concept behind the Priestley–Taylor model is that an air mass moving above a vegetated area with abundant water would become saturated with water. In these conditions, the actual evapotranspiration would match the Penman rate of potential evapotranspiration. However, observations revealed that actual evaporation was 1.26 times greater than potential evaporation, and therefore the equation for actual evaporation was found by taking potential evapotranspiration and multiplying it by $\alpha$. The assumption here is for vegetation with an abundant water supply (i.e. the plants have low moisture stress). Areas like arid regions with high moisture stress are estimated to have higher $\alpha$ values.

The assumption that an air mass moving over a vegetated surface with abundant water saturates has been questioned later. The lowest and turbulent part of the atmosphere, the atmospheric boundary layer, is not a closed box, but constantly brings in dry air from higher up in the atmosphere towards the surface. As water evaporates more easily into a dry atmosphere, evapotranspiration is enhanced. This explains the larger than unity value of the Priestley-Taylor parameter $\alpha$. The proper equilibrium of the system has been derived and involves the characteristics of the interface of the atmospheric boundary layer and the overlying free atmosphere.

== Climate change and PET ==
Potential evapotranspiration is strongly dependent on the vapor pressure deficit and consequently temperature. As the global temperature increases, both the relative humidity and PET increase with it. As the temperature warms, the air gains the ability to hold more moisture as dictated by the Clausius-Clapeyron relation. Overall, the climate has a higher demand to evaporate and/or transpire moisture in the warming globe.

The larger capacity of the air to hold moisture and the increased demand for moisture can lead to drying out of vegetation and soil on the surface (depending on the relative humidity in the given climate). This can lead to more numerous and intense wildfires in dry areas.

== See also ==
- Effects of climate change on the water cycle
- Evaporation
- Evaporative Demand Drought Index
- Water vapor
- Water cycle
- Köppen climate classification
- Vapor pressure deficit
