= Abtew Method =

The Abtew Method is a remote sensing method for measuring evapotranspiration created by Wossenu Abtew in 1996. It is sometimes referred to as the radiative Abtew model.

== Equation ==
The Abtew Method has advantages over other methods in that it only depends on solar radiation data. This is useful when modeling evaporation in areas where satellite remote sensing solar radiation data is the only data available.

The equation is represented as

$ET = K\frac{R_{s}}{\lambda }$

where

- $ET$ is evapotranspiration in millimeters/day
- $K$ is a dimensionless coefficient
- $R_{s}$ is solar radiation measured in MJ/m^2/day
- $\lambda$ is latent heat of vaporization in MJ/kg
