= Cullum Geographical Medal =

American Geographical Society award

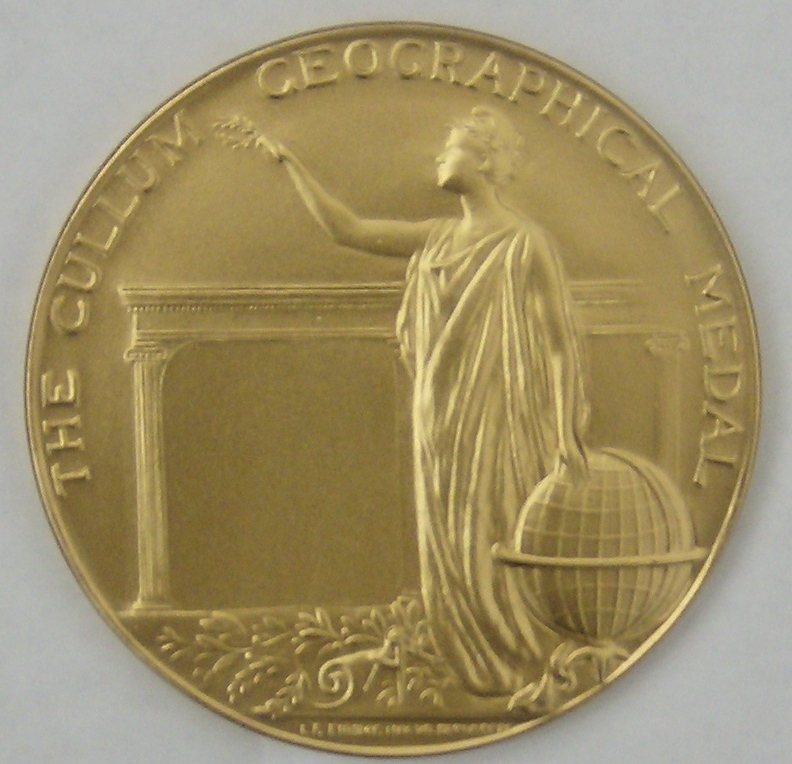
Medal frontside

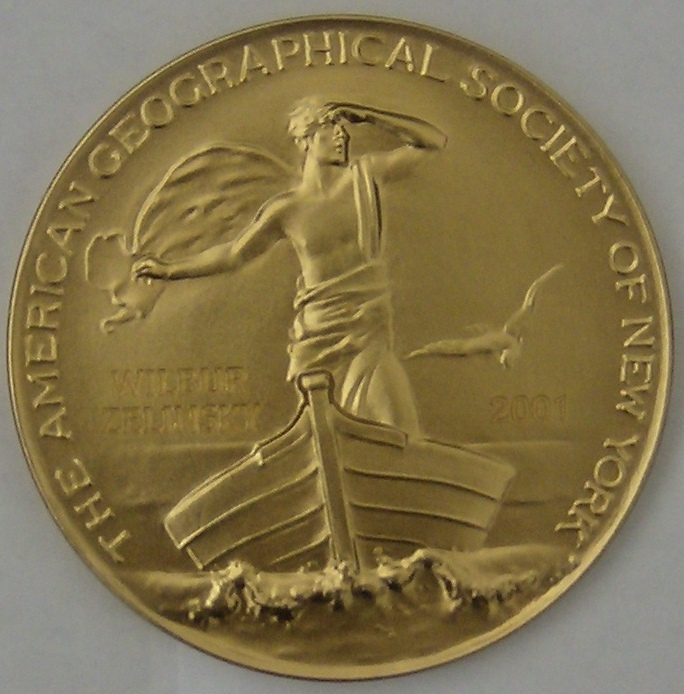
Medal backside

The Cullum Geographical Medal is one of the oldest awards of the American Geographical Society. It was established in the will of George Washington Cullum, the vice president of the Society, and is awarded "to those who distinguish themselves by geographical discoveries or in the advancement of geographical science". It was first awarded in 1896 to Robert Peary. The gold medal was designed by Lydia Field Emmet.

"On the front is the figure of a young man standing in the bow of a boat. He has thrown down his oars upon discovering land. He shades his eyes with his hand as the boat progresses through the waves. A sea gull, hovering, indicates the proximity of land. The whole is supposed to represent enterprise and the spirit of exploration. Inscribed on the face of the medal is: The American Geographical Society of New York."

"The reverse, to typify achievement and award, bears a female figure – Columbia, the left hand resting on a globe and the right holding out a laurel wreath. Beneath the right arm is the tablet to bear the record of the achievement for which the award is made. On the side is the inscription: The Cullum Geographical Medal."

== Recipients ==
Source: American Geographical Society

- 1896: Robert Peary
- 1897: Fridtjof Nansen
- 1899: John Murray
- 1901: Thomas C. Mendenhall
- 1902: A. Donaldson Smith
- 1903: Prince Luigi Amedeo
- 1904: Georg von Neumayer, Sven Hedin
- 1906: Robert Bell, Robert Falcon Scott
- 1908: William Morris Davis
- 1909: Francisco Moreno, Ernest Shackleton
- 1910: Hermann Wagner
- 1911: Jean-Baptiste Charcot
- 1914: John Scott Keltie, Ellen Churchill Semple
- 1917: George W. Goethals
- 1918: Frederick Haynes Newell
- 1919: Emmanuel de Margerie, Henry Fairfield Osborn
- 1921: Albert I, Prince of Monaco
- 1922: Edward A. Reeves
- 1924: Jovan Cvijić
- 1925: Lucien Gallois, Harvey C. Hayes, Pedro C. Sánchez
- 1929: Jean Brunhes, Alfred Hettner, Hugh Robert Mill, Jules de Schokalsky
- 1930: Curtis F. Marbut
- 1931: Mark Jefferson
- 1932: Bertram Thomas
- 1935: Douglas Johnson
- 1938: Louise Arner Boyd
- 1939: Emmanuel de Martonne
- 1940: Robert Cushman Murphy
- 1943: Arthur Robert Hinks
- 1948: Hugh Hammond Bennett
- 1950: Hans Wilhelmsson Ahlmann
- 1952: Roberto Almagià
- 1954: 1953 British Mount Everest expedition
- 1956: J. Russell Smith
- 1958: C. W. Thornthwaite
- 1959: Albert P. Crary
- 1961: Maurice Ewing
- 1962: Richard Joel Russell
- 1963: Rachel Carson
- 1964: John Leighly
- 1965: Kirtley F. Mather
- 1967: Peter Haggett
- 1968: Luna Leopold
- 1969: Neil Armstrong, Buzz Aldrin, Michael Collins
- 1973: Bruce Heezen
- 1975: René Dubos
- 1985: Chauncy Harris
- 1987: Kenneth Hare, Yi-Fu Tuan
- 1989: M. Gordon Wolman
- 1997: Melvin G. Marcus
- 1999: Jack Dangermond, David Lowenthal
- 2001: Wilbur Zelinsky
- 2009: Peter Smith, Matthew Henson
- 2014: Lee Schwartz
- 2020: Jerome Dobson
- 2021: Laura Pulido

== See also ==
- List of geography awards

== Sources ==
- "Transactions of the Society, January–March 1897". Journal of the American Geographical Society of New York. 29 (1): 121. 1897.
- "The American Geographical Society's awards ceremony on Wednesday, April 15". UDaily. University of Delaware. April 6, 2009.
