= SEBAL =

The Surface Energy Balance Algorithm for Land (SEBAL) uses the '''surface''' energy balance to estimate aspects of the hydrological cycle. SEBAL maps evapotranspiration, biomass growth, water deficit and soil moisture. Its main creator is Prof. Dr. W.G.M. Bastiaanssen

== Model background ==
The basis of SEBAL is the energy balance: the energy driving the hydrological cycle is equal to the incoming energy minus:

1. the energy going to heating of the soil and air, and
2. the energy reflected back to space.

SEBAL quantifies the energy balance using satellite data as an input. Land surface characteristics such as surface albedo, leaf area index, vegetation index and surface temperature are derived from satellite imagery. In addition to satellite images, the SEBAL model requires meteorological data, such as wind speed, humidity, solar radiation and air temperature. It uses meteorological data from the moment of the recording of the satellite data to solve the 'instantaneous' energy balance, and uses extrapolation to calculate daily evapotranspiration. Using a time series of satellite and meteorological data, periodic cumulative (e.g. weekly, monthly, yearly) evapotranspiration data can be calculated.

The SEBAL model uses the energy balance, as opposed to in hydrology common water balance to solve for evapotranspiration.

== Applications ==
The energy balance applies to all scales, ranging from global to river basin to region to farm and to field level. Satellite images come in a wide variety of spatial and temporal resolutions. Evapotranspiration and biomass production are key indicators for water management and irrigation performance.

The combination of the energy balance with input from remote sensing data is applied by farmers, irrigation districts, catchment management agencies and regional and national governments.

== See also ==
- METRIC, model developed by University of Idaho that uses Landsat satellite data to compute and map evapotranspiration
- BAITSSS, evapotranspiration (ET) computer model which determines water use, primarily in agriculture landscape, using remote sensing-based information
