= Vapour-pressure deficit =

Difference between moisture in air and moisture capacity

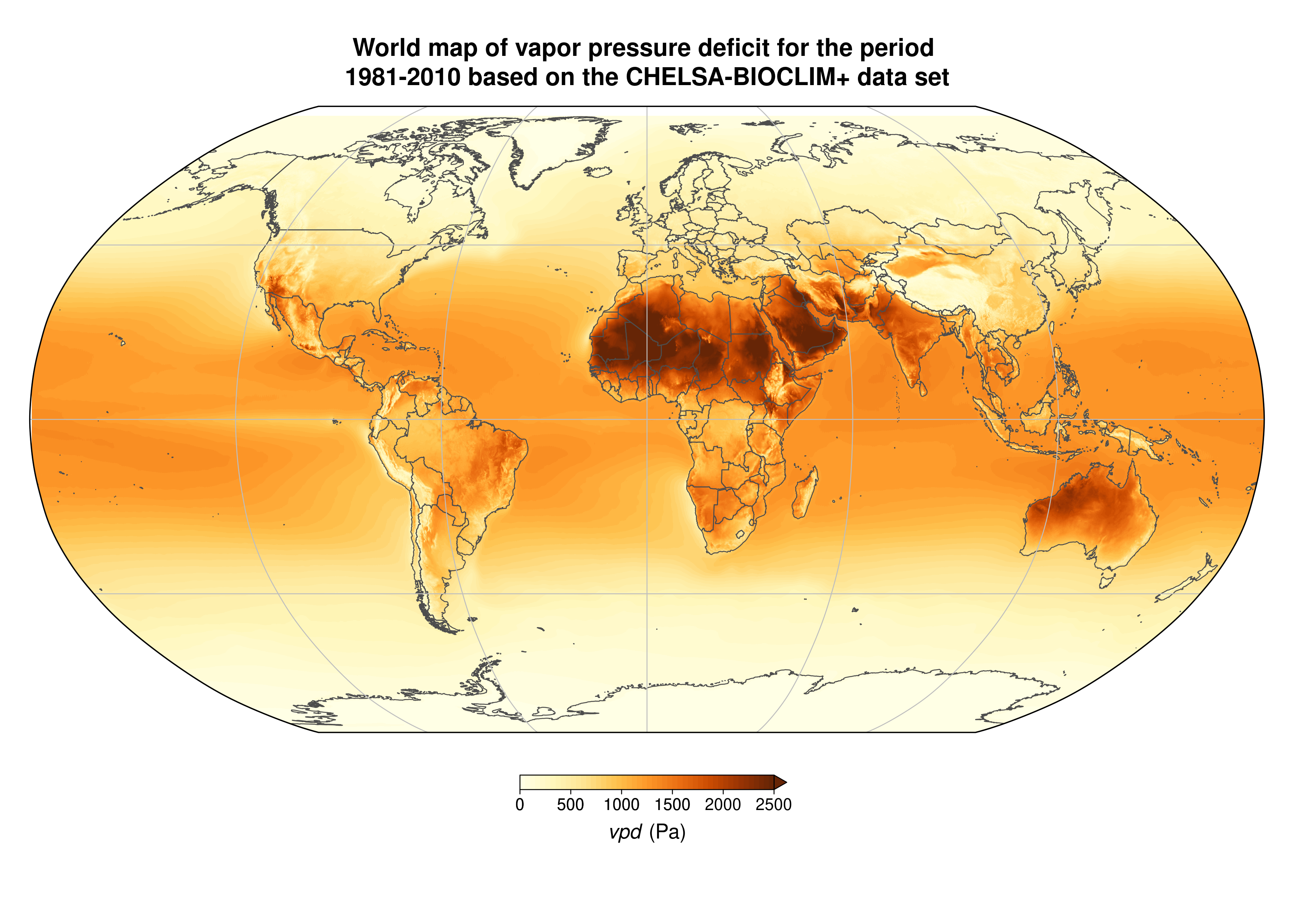
Global distribution of Vapour-pressure deficit averaged over the years 1981-2010 from the CHELSA-BIOCLIM+ data set

Vapour pressure-deficit, or VPD, is the difference (deficit) between the amount of moisture in the air and how much moisture the air can hold when it is saturated.

In equation form:

$VPD = e_s(T_a) - e_a$

$e_a$ = actual vapor pressure

$e_s(T_a)$ = saturation vapor pressure at temperature T_{a}

Once air becomes saturated, water will condense to form clouds, dew or films of water over leaves. It is this last instance that makes VPD important for greenhouse regulation. If a film of water forms on a plant leaf, it becomes far more susceptible to rot. On the other hand, as the VPD increases, the plant needs to draw more water from its roots. In the case of cuttings, the plant may dry out and die. For this reason the ideal range for VPD in a greenhouse is from 0.45 kPa to 1.25 kPa, ideally sitting at around 0.85 kPa. As a general rule, most plants grow well at VPDs of between 0.8 and 0.95 kPa.

In ecology, it is the difference between the water vapour pressure and the saturation water vapour pressure at a particular temperature. Unlike relative humidity, vapour-pressure deficit has a simple nearly straight-line relationship to the rate of evapotranspiration and other measures of evaporation. Also, vapor pressure deficit is a more concrete measurement of the difference of the moisture content in the air, while relative humidity is a ratio of the actual vapor pressure to the saturation vapor pressure at the given temperature.

== Computing VPD for plants in a greenhouse ==
To compute the VPD, we need the ambient (greenhouse) air temperature, the relative humidity and, if possible, the canopy air temperature. We must then compute the saturation pressure. Saturation pressure can be looked up in a psychrometric chart or derived from the Arrhenius equation; a way to compute it directly from temperature is

$$vp_\text{sat} = e^{A/T + B + CT + DT^2 + ET^3 + F\ln T},$$

where

$vp_\text{sat}$ is the saturation vapor pressure in PSI,
$$A = -1.0440397 \times 10^4$$,
$$B = -11.29465$$,
$$C = -2.7022355 \times 10^{-2}$$,
$$D = 1.289036  \times 10^{-5}$$,
$$E = -2.4780681 \times 10^{-9}$$,
$$F = 6.5459673$$,
$T$ is temperature of the air in the Rankine scale.

To convert between Rankine and degrees Fahrenheit: $T[\text{R}] = T[^\circ\text{F}] + 459.67$

We compute this pressure for both the ambient and canopy temperatures.

We then can compute the partial pressure of the water vapour in the air by multiplying by the relative humidity [%]:

$$vp_\text{air} = vp_\text{sat} \times (\text{relative humidity})/100$$,

and finally VPD using $vp_\text{sat} - vp_\text{air}$ or $vp_\text{canopy sat} - vp_\text{air}$ when the canopy temperature is known, or simply

$$VPD = vp_\text{sat} \times (1-\text{relative humidity}/100)$$.

It can easily be seen from this formula that if $T$ rises (which raises $vp_\text{sat}$), but relative humidity remains constant, $VPD$ will increase.

== Climate ==
VPD can be a limiting factor in plant growth. Climate change is predicted to increase the importance of VPD in plant growth, and will further limit growth rates across ecosystems.

VPD is also a strong influencer of potential evapotranspiration, which has important effects in the warming climate.

== Vapour-pressure deficit management in agriculture ==
In controlled environments, such as greenhouses, vapor pressure deficit can be managed to maximize production. Excessive VPD can be reduced with misting or irrigation, or low VPD can be boosted by dehumidification or ventilation.

== Application in contexts of wildfire ==
As the vapor pressure deficit increases, the amount of moisture in the vegetation and soil decreases, leading to drier conditions. VPD correlates strongly with the area that has been burned by wildfires in the southwest United States. Warming temperatures and drops in actual vapor pressure have contributed to an increase of VPD in the southwest U.S. Conversely, in the northern Plains and midwest, an increase in actual vapor pressure has caused a decrease in VPD.

The vapour pressure deficit can be utilized when predicting behaviour of a wildfire. Such predictions are an essential tool of wildfire suppression. One operational example is the Hot-Dry-Windy Index, a U.S. fire weather index defined as the product of maximum wind speed and maximum VPD within roughly the lowest 500 meters of the atmosphere.

== See also ==
- Fire weather
- Hot-Dry-Windy Index
- Water vapour
