= METRIC =

Computer model to map evapotranspiration

METRIC (Mapping EvapoTranspiration at high Resolution with Internalized Calibration) is a computer model developed by the University of Idaho, that uses Landsat satellite data to compute and map evapotranspiration (ET). METRIC calculates ET as a residual of the surface energy balance, where ET is estimated by keeping account of total net short wave and long wave radiation at the vegetation or soil surface, the amount of heat conducted into soil, and the amount of heat convected into the air above the surface. The difference in these three terms represents the amount of energy absorbed during the conversion of liquid water to vapor, which is ET. METRIC expresses near-surface temperature gradients used in heat convection as indexed functions of radiometric surface temperature, thereby eliminating the need for absolutely accurate surface temperature and the need for air-temperature measurements.

The surface energy balance is internally calibrated using ground-based reference ET that is based on local weather or gridded weather data sets to reduce computational biases inherent to remote sensing-based energy balance. Slope and aspect functions and temperature lapsing are used for application to mountainous terrain. METRIC algorithms are designed for relatively routine application by trained engineers and other technical professionals who possess a familiarity with energy balance and basic radiation physics. The primary inputs for the model are short-wave and long-wave thermal images from a satellite e.g., Landsat and MODIS, a digital elevation model, and ground-based weather data measured within or near the area of interest. ET “maps” i.e., images via METRIC provide the means to quantify ET on a field-by-field basis in terms of both the rate and spatial distribution. The use of surface energy balance can detect reduced ET caused by water shortage.

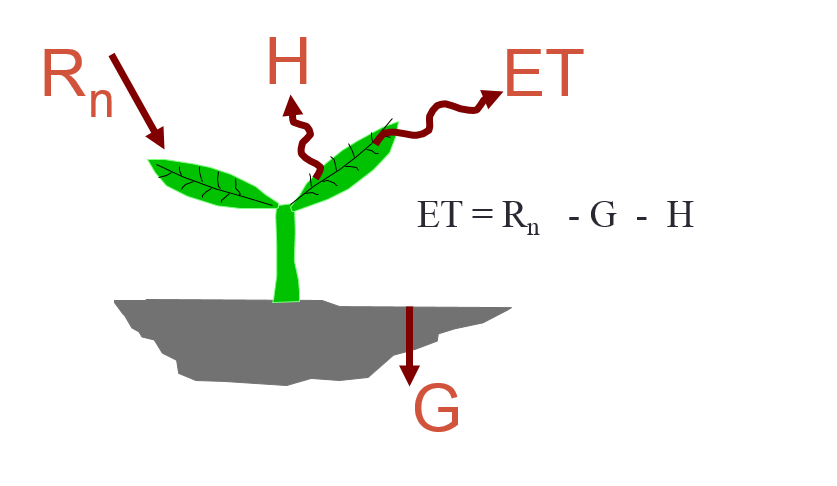
The surface energy balance is used in many thermal-based remote sensing models to estimate ET. Rn is net radiation; H is sensible heat flux; G is heat conduction to the ground and ET is the amount of energy consumed by evapotranspiration (conversion of liquid water to vapor).

In the decade since Idaho introduced METRIC, it has been adopted for use in Montana, California, New Mexico, Utah, Wyoming, Texas, Nebraska, Colorado, Nevada, and Oregon. The mapping method has enabled these states to negotiate Native American water rights; assess agriculture to urban water transfers; manage aquifer depletion, monitor water right compliance; and protect endangered species.

== See also ==
- SEBAL, uses the surface energy balance to estimate aspects of the hydrological cycle. SEBAL maps evapotranspiration, biomass growth, water deficit and soil moisture
- BAITSSS, evapotranspiration (ET) computer model which determines water use, primarily in agriculture landscape, using remote sensing-based information
