= Blaney–Criddle equation =

The Blaney–Criddle equation (named after H. F. Blaney and W. D. Criddle) is a method for estimating reference crop evapotranspiration.

== Usage ==
The Blaney–Criddle equation is a relatively simplistic method for calculating evapotranspiration. When sufficient meteorological data is available the Penman–Monteith equation is usually preferred. However, the Blaney–Criddle equation is ideal when only air-temperature datasets are available for a site.

Given the coarse accuracy of the Blaney–Criddle equation, it is recommended that it be used to calculate evapotranspiration for periods of one month or greater.

The equation calculates evapotranspiration for a 'reference crop', which is taken as actively growing green grass of 8–15 cm height.

== Equation ==
ET_{o} = p ·(0.457·T_{mean} + 8.128)

Where:

ET_{o} is the reference evapotranspiration [mm day^{−1}] (monthly)

T_{mean} is the mean daily temperature [°C] given as T_{mean} = (T_{max} + T_{min} )/ 2

p is the mean daily percentage of annual daytime hours.

== Accuracy and bias ==
Given the limited data input to the equation, the calculated evapotranspiration should be regarded as only broadly accurate. Rather than a precise measure of evapotranspiration, the output of the equation is better thought of as providing an order of magnitude.

The inaccuracy of the equation is exacerbated by extreme variants of weather. In particular evapotranspiration is known to be exaggerated by up to 40% in calm, humid, clouded areas and depreciated by 60% in windy, dry, sunny areas.

== See also ==
- Jensen–Haise equation (M. E. Jensen and H. R. Haise, 1963)
- Penman–Monteith equation
