= QSO J1819+3845 =

Galaxy in the constellation Hercules

Observation data (Epoch J2000)
- Constellation: Hercules
- Right ascension: 18^{h} 19^{m} 26.55^{s}
- Declination: +38° 45′ 01.8″
- Redshift: 0.54
- Type: EmG
- Notable features: Most variable quasar radio source

Other designations
- QSO J1819+3845, QSO B1817+387, QSO 1817+387, MITG J181925+3844

QSO J1819+3845 is a quasar notable for being the most variable known extragalactic radio source. This quasar shows variations of factors of four or more on a timescale of hours.

The variations have been shown to be due to scattering in the interstellar medium (ISM). This quasar furnished the elegant proof of the role of scattering due to the ISM, or interstellar scintillation, by showing a time delay in arrival between the signal at widely spaced telescopes (in the US and Netherlands).

Interstellar scintillation is the observed effect of interference and refractive phenomena due to the ISM. It can be thought of as the ISM focusing and defocusing the radio waves from the source, producing a pattern of dark and bright patches, rather like light and dark patches at the bottom of a fish pond. As the Earth moves through these patches we observe a temporal variation in the radio intensity (like a fish swimming through light and dark patches).

If the standard theory of diffractive scintillation is assumed to apply, ground-based radio traces would seem to require that J1819+3845 contains a component that must be less than about 5 microarcseconds across; this would require its temperature to be in excess of 10^{15} K. However, the scintillation may perhaps be interpreted as being due to an unusual piece of intervening interstellar medium.

Nonetheless, its importance lies in having proved the importance of interstellar scintillation in creating the observed variations in brightness in at least some quasars, which had been the subject of some discussion.
