= C. W. Thornthwaite =

American geographer and climatologist

Charles Warren Thornthwaite
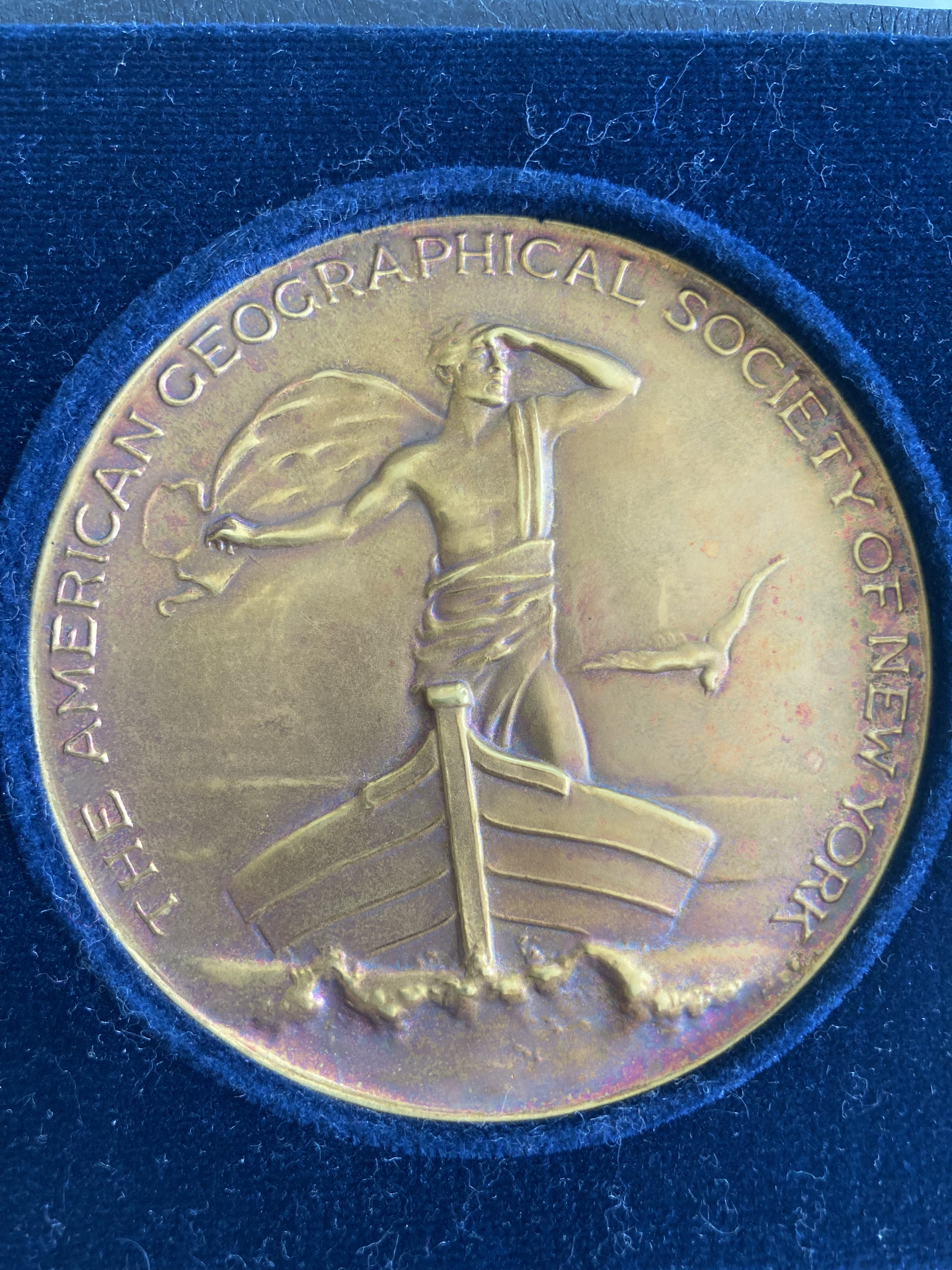
- Thornthwaite's Cullum Geographical Medal received in 1959.
- Born: March 7, 1899; Pinconning, Michigan, US
- Died: June 11, 1963 (aged 64); Arlington County, Virginia, US
- Occupations: geographer, climatologist
- Known for: Thornthwaite climate classification, soil climate analysis, studies of potential evapotranspiration

Charles Warren Thornthwaite (March 7, 1899 – June 11, 1963) was an American geographer and climatologist. He is best known for devising the Thornthwaite climate classification, a climate classification system modified in 1948 that is still in use worldwide, and also for his detailed water budget computations of potential evapotranspiration.

He was Professor of Climatology at Johns Hopkins University, adjunct professor at Drexel University, President of the Commission for Climatology of the World Meteorological Organization, a recipient of the Outstanding Achievement Award of the Association of American Geographers, and the Cullum Geographical Medal from the American Geographical Society.

== Early life ==
Thornthwaite was born near Pinconning, Michigan. His father was a farmer. He attended Central Michigan Normal School, graduating in 1922. He taught at high school for the next two years in Owosso, Michigan, during which time he took courses at the University of Michigan.

== Career ==
In 1925, Thornthwaite moved to California and attended the University of California, Berkeley to complete a Ph.D. under Carl Sauer. For five years he was employed part-time as a geographer for the Kentucky Geological Survey. In 1927, he moved to Oklahoma and became an assistant professor in the University of Oklahoma Department of Geography, serving there from 1927 to 1934. Each semester at the University of Oklahoma, he taught four or five courses and added new courses. He wrote his first published article about climate in 1929 while in Oklahoma: "The Polar Front and the Interpretation and Prediction of Oklahoma Weather". During his time in Oklahoma, Thornthwaite developed an interest in the climate of the Great Plains, and published a review in the Geographical Review in 1932.

In 1939, he received his Ph.D. in geography from the University of California, Berkeley; his thesis was on "Louisville, Kentucky: A Study in Urban Geography", a research project which used aerial photographs, field observation, data analysis and detailed mapping to describe the urban geography of Louisville. He moved away from geography to climatology, but recent scholarship suggests he was nonetheless ahead of his time in his thesis project and that many of the techniques he used would later be standard procedures. It is likely that Thornthwaite's thesis was about geography rather than climatology due to the influence of Carl Sauer.

At Central Michigan Normal School, Thornthwaite befriended John Leighly. Later, they both studied at Berkeley, with Leighly becoming his mentor. Leighly, a professor at UC Berkeley for 62 years, would write his obituary.

In 1931 Thornthwaite published "The Climates of North America: According to a New Classification", which launched his career as a climatologist and married the science of climatology with that of geography. The article and the classification were inspired by the Köppen climate classification system. Thornthwaite learned about the Köppen while at UC Berkeley and while in Oklahoma he began to study the flaws of the classification. He then set out to create a new classification that could apply to North America. He stated in "The Climates of North America: According to a New Classification" that the effectiveness of temperature and precipitation were more important than crude measurements of temperature and precipitation. Effective temperature was the rate of plant growth resulting from temperature, and effective precipitation depended on both the amount of precipitation and the amount of water that evaporated. Thornthwaite created the P-E index to measure precipitation and evaporation, which he did from April to September in twenty-one stations in the United States. He also tried to create a T-E index to measure temperature effectiveness, an equation that gave the poleward limit of the tundra a T-E index of zero and the poleward limit of the tropical rainforest a T-E index of 128, with six temperature zones between the two limits. The T-E index was quite cumbersome and thus was not used often, but is still considered better than the previous index. Following the publication of "The Climates of North America: According to a New Classification", Thornthwaite was applying the classification on a worldwide level by collecting data from more than four thousand stations to create a world map. The map was more rational than the previous map created by Köppen but rather complicated and never popularized. In 1934, he left the University of Oklahoma to study internal migration within the United States at the University of Pennsylvania.

In 1935, he was appointed chief of the climatic and physiographic research division of the U.S. Soil Conservation Service in the U.S. Department of Agriculture. The division ceased to function in 1942, but he remained on staff of the USDA until 1946. Included in his output from this period was the USDA technical bulletin, written with Benjamin Holzman, Measurement of Evaporation from Land and Water Surfaces.

Leaving government in 1946, Thornthwaite opened the Laboratory of Climatology in Seabrook, New Jersey, which he operated until his death in 1963. The facility continued to operate under the management of John Russell Mather. One of his first papers would also be his most cited: "An Approach Toward a Rational Classification of Climate" (1948). This paper would be used by scientists across North America and around the world. It incorporates evapotranspiration, temperature and precipitation information and is widely used in studying animal species diversity and potential impacts of climate change.

Mather shared authorship with Thornthwaite in their 1955 monograph "The Water Balance", which was Thornthwaite's second major contribution to climatology, after Rational Classification. The water budget was a simple and easily used methodology for estimating water surpluses and runoff, and the difference between surpluses and runoff, to estimate the amount of water would recharge an aquifer.

Thornthwaite was a professor of climatology at Johns Hopkins University from 1947 to 1955.

== Personal life ==
Thornthwaite married Denzil Slentz in 1925. They had three daughters. When his wife died in 1962, he established the Charles Warren and Denzil Slentz Thornthwaite Memorial Scholarship Fund in her memory. The fund awards annual merit scholarships to students in meteorology and earth science at Central Michigan University. Thornthwaite died of cancer on June 11, 1963 in Arlington County, Virginia.
