= Deficit irrigation =

Watering strategy

Deficit irrigation (DI) is a watering strategy that can be applied by different types of irrigation application methods. The correct application of DI requires thorough understanding of the yield response to water (crop sensitivity to drought stress) and of the economic impact of reductions in harvest. In regions where water resources are restrictive it can be more profitable for a farmer to maximize crop water productivity instead of maximizing the harvest per unit land. The saved water can be used for other purposes or to irrigate extra units of land. DI is sometimes referred to as incomplete supplemental irrigation or regulated DI.

== Definition ==
Deficit irrigation (DI) has been reviewed and defined as follows:

Deficit irrigation is an optimization strategy in which irrigation is applied during drought-sensitive growth stages of a crop. Outside these periods, irrigation is limited or even unnecessary if rainfall provides a minimum supply of water. Water restriction is limited to drought-tolerant phenological stages, often the vegetative stages and the late ripening period. Total irrigation application is therefore not proportional to irrigation requirements throughout the crop cycle. While this inevitably results in plant drought stress and consequently in production loss, DI maximizes irrigation water productivity, which is the main limiting factor (English, 1990). In other words, DI aims at stabilizing yields and at obtaining maximum crop water productivity rather than maximum yields (Zhang and Oweis, 1999).

== Crop water productivity ==
Crop water productivity (WP) or water use efficiency (WUE) expressed in kg/m³ is an efficiency term, expressing the amount of marketable product (e.g. kilograms of grain) in relation to the amount of input needed to produce that output (cubic meters of water). The water used for crop production is referred to as crop evapotranspiration. This is a combination of water lost by evaporation from the soil surface and transpiration by the plant, occurring simultaneously. Except by modeling, distinguishing between the two processes is difficult. Representative values of WUE for cereals at field level, expressed with evapotranspiration in the denominator, can vary between 0.10 and 4 kg/m3.

== Experiences with deficit irrigation ==
For certain crops, experiments confirm that deficit irrigation (DI) can increase water use efficiency without severe yield reductions. For example for winter wheat in Turkey, planned DI increased yields by 65% as compared to winter wheat under rainfed cultivation, and had double the water use efficiency as compared to rainfed and fully irrigated winter wheat. Similar positive results have been described for cotton. Experiments in Turkey and India indicated that the irrigation water use for cotton could be reduced to up to 60 percent of the total crop water requirement with limited yield losses. In this way, high water productivity and a better nutrient-water balance was obtained.

Certain underutilized and horticultural crops also respond favorably to DI, such as tested at experimental and farmer level for the crop quinoa. Yields could be stabilized at around 1.6 tons per hectare by supplementing irrigation water if rainwater was lacking during the plant establishment and reproductive stages. Applying irrigation water throughout the whole season (full irrigation) reduced the water productivity. Also in viticulture and fruit tree cultivation, DI is practiced.

Scientists affiliated with the Agricultural Research Service (ARS) of the USDA found that conserving water by forcing drought (or deficit irrigation) on peanut plants early in the growing season has shown to cause early maturation of the plant yet still maintain sufficient yield of the crop. Inducing drought through deficit irrigation earlier in the season caused the peanut plants to physiologically "learn" how to adapt to a stressful drought environment, making the plants better able to cope with drought that commonly occurs later in the growing season. Deficit irrigation is beneficial for the farmers because it reduces the cost of water and prevents a loss of crop yield (for certain crops) later on in the growing season due to drought. In addition to these findings, ARS scientists suggest that deficit irrigation accompanied with conservation tillage would greatly reduce the peanut crop water requirement.

For other crops, the application of deficit irrigation will result in a lower water use efficiency and yield. This is the case when crops are sensitive to drought stress throughout the complete season, such as maize.

Apart from university research groups and farmers associations, international organizations such as FAO, ICARDA, IWMI and the CGIAR Challenge Program on Water and Food are studying DI.

== Reasons for increased water productivity under deficit irrigation ==
If crops have certain phenological phases in which they are tolerant to water stress, DI can increase the ratio of yield over crop water consumption (evapotranspiration) by either reducing the water loss by unproductive evaporation, and/or by increasing the proportion of marketable yield to the totally produced biomass (harvest index), and/or by increasing the proportion of total biomass production to transpiration due to hardening of the crop - although this effect is very limited due to the conservative relation between biomass production and crop transpiration, - and/or due to adequate fertilizer application and/or by avoiding bad agronomic conditions during crop growth, such as water logging in the root zone, pests and diseases, etc.

== Advantages ==
The correct application of deficit irrigation for a certain crop:

- maximizes the productivity of water, generally with adequate harvest quality;
- allows economic planning and stable income due to a stabilization of the harvest in comparison with rainfed cultivation;
- decreases the risk of certain diseases linked to high humidity (e.g. fungi) in comparison with full irrigation;
- reduces nutrient loss by leaching of the root zone, which results in better groundwater quality and lower fertilizer needs as for cultivation under full irrigation;
- improves control over the sowing date and length of the growing period independent from the onset of the rainy season and therefore improves agricultural planning.

== Constraints ==
A number of constraints apply to deficit irrigation:

- Exact knowledge of the crop response to water stress is imperative.
- There should be sufficient flexibility in access to water during periods of high demand (drought sensitive stages of a crop).
- A minimum quantity of water should be guaranteed for the crop, below which DI has no significant beneficial effect.
- An individual farmer should consider the benefit for the total water users community (extra land can be irrigated with the saved water), when he faces a below-maximum yield;
- Because irrigation is applied more efficiently, the risk for soil salinization is higher under DI as compared to full irrigation.

== Modeling ==
Field experimentation is necessary for correct application of DI for a particular crop in a particular region. In addition, simulation of the soil water balance and related crop growth (crop water productivity modeling) can be a valuable decision support tool. By conjunctively simulating the effects of different influencing factors (climate, soil, management, crop characteristics) on crop production, models allow to (1) better understand the mechanism behind improved water use efficiency, to (2) schedule the necessary irrigation applications during the drought sensitive crop growth stages, considering the possible variability in climate, to (3) test DI strategies of specific crops in new regions, and to (4) investigate the effects of future climate scenarios or scenarios of altered management practices on crop production.

== See also ==
- Dryland farming
- Irrigation
- Irrigation in viticulture
- Environmental impact of irrigation
- Virtual water
- Water crisis
- Water footprint
- Evapotranspiration
