= Scintillometer =

Measures fluctuations in the refractive index of air

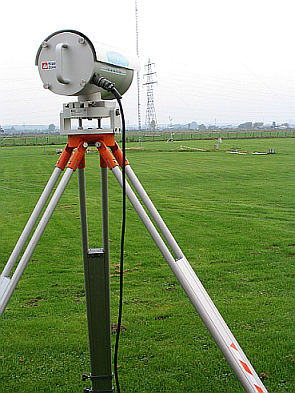
A Large Aperture Scintillometer (transmitter) for measurement of the sensible heat flux over long distances at Wageningen University measurement site

A scintillometer is a scientific device used to measure turbulent fluctuations of the refractive index of air caused by variations in temperature, humidity, and pressure. It consists of an optical or radio wave transmitter and a receiver at opposite ends of an atmospheric propagation path. The receiver detects and evaluates the intensity fluctuations of the transmitted signal, called scintillation.

The magnitude of the refractive index fluctuations is usually measured in terms of $C_n^2$, the structure constant of refractive index fluctuations, which is the spectral amplitude of refractive index fluctuations in the inertial subrange of turbulence. Some types of scintillometers, such as displaced-beam scintillometers, can also measure the inner scale of refractive index fluctuations, which is the smallest size of eddies in the inertial subrange.

Scintillometers also allow measurements of the transfer of heat between the Earth's surface and the air above, called the sensible heat flux. Inner-scale scintillometers can also measure the dissipation rate of turbulent kinetic energy and the momentum flux.

== See also ==
- Transmissometer
- Nephelometer
