= Crop coefficient =

Crop coefficients are properties of plants used in predicting evapotranspiration (ET). The most basic crop coefficient, K_{c}, is simply the ratio of ET observed for the crop studied over that observed for the well calibrated reference crop under the same conditions.

$PET = K_c * RET$

Potential evapotranspiration (PET), is the evaporation and transpiration that potentially could occur if a field of the crop had an ideal unlimited water supply. RET is the reference ET often denoted as ET_{0}.

Even in agricultural crops, where ideal conditions are approximated as much as is practical, plants are not always growing (and therefore transpiring) at their theoretical potential. Plants have growth stages and states of health induced by a variety of environmental conditions.

RET usually represents the PET of the reference crop's most active growth. K_{c} then becomes a function or series of values specific to the crop of interest through its growing season. These can be quite elaborate in the case of certain maize varieties, but tend to use a trapezoidal or leaf area index (LAI) curve for common crop or vegetation canopies.

Stress coefficients, K_{s}, account for diminished ET due to specific stress factors. These are often assumed to combine by multiplication.

$ET_{estimate} = K_w * K_{s_1} * K_{s_2} * K_c * ET_o$

Water stress is the most ubiquitous stress factor, often denoted as K_{w}. Stress coefficients tend to be functions ranging between 0 and 1. The simplest are linear, but thresholds are appropriate for some toxicity responses. Crop coefficients can exceed 1 when the crop evapotranspiration exceeds that of RET.
