= John Leighly =

American Geographer

- Born: November 6, 1895; Locust Grove, Ohio, US
- Died: July 9, 1986 (aged 90); Berkeley, California, US
- Occupations: Geographer, writer, professor (1927–1960)
- Years active: 1927–1960
- Notable work: Geography of the Pennyroyal : a Study of the Influence of Geology and Physiography Upon Industry, Commerce and Life of the People; Graphic Studies in Climatology II – The Polar Form Of Diagram in the Plotting of the Annual Climatic Cycle
- Awards: Cullum Geographical Medal (1964)

John Leighly (November 6, 1895 – July 9, 1986) was a 20th-century American geographer and professor.

== Works ==
- "Untitled social item" (PDF). The Monadnock of the Clark Geographical Society. 8 (1): 7. December 1933.
- "Geography of the Pennyroyal : a Study of the Influence of Geology and Physiography Upon Industry, Commerce and Life of the People". HardPress Publishing. August 27, 2014 – via Amazon.
- Leighly, John B. (January 1, 1928). "Graphic Studies In Climatology Ii - The Polar Form Of Diagram In The Plotting Of The Annual Climatic Cycle". University Of California Press – via Amazon.
