= Surface temperature =

Surface temperature is the temperature at a surface.

Specifically, it may refer to:

- Near-surface air temperature, the temperature of the air near the surface of the Earth
- Sea surface temperature, the temperature of water close to the ocean's surface
- Global surface temperature, the combined global average of near-surface air temperature and sea surface temperature
- Surface temperature of a star, often the effective temperature

== See also ==
- Instrumental temperature record, the historical record of in situ measurements of surface air and sea temperatures
- Pyrometer, a device that remotely determines the temperature of a surface
  - Infrared thermometer, a type of pyrometer
