= SSURGO =

Soil Survey Geographic database

SSURGO (Soil Survey Geographic database) refers to digital soils data produced and distributed by the Natural Resources Conservation Service (NRCS) - National Cartography and Geospatial Center (NCGC) in the United States.

The database has information on soil types and their distribution. The information covers soil characteristics, soil properties, and addresses limits, risks and suitability for various uses.
