= Psychrometric constant =

Relation of the partial pressure of water in air to temperature

The psychrometric constant $\gamma$ relates the partial pressure of water in air to the air temperature. This lets one interpolate actual vapor pressure from paired dry and wet thermometer bulb temperature readings.

$$\gamma =\frac{ \left( c_p \right)_{air} *  P }{ \lambda_v * MW_{ratio} }$$

$\gamma =$ psychrometric constant [kPa °C^{−1}],

P = atmospheric pressure [kPa],

$\lambda_v =$ latent heat of water vaporization, 2.45 [MJ kg^{−1}],

$c_p =$ specific heat of air at constant pressure, [MJ kg^{−1} °C^{−1}],

$MW_{ratio} =$ ratio molecular weight of water vapor/dry air = 0.622.

Both $\lambda_v$ and $MW_{ratio}$ are constants.
Since atmospheric pressure, P, depends upon altitude, so does $\gamma$.
At higher altitude water evaporates and boils at lower temperature.

Although $\left( c_p \right)_{H_2 O}$ is constant, varied air composition results in varied $\left( c_p \right)_{air}$.

Thus on average, at a given location or altitude, the psychrometric constant is approximately constant. Still, it is worth remembering that weather impacts both atmospheric pressure and composition.

== Vapor Pressure Estimation ==
Saturation vapor pressure, $e_s ( T_{dew}) = e_a$
Actual vapor pressure, $e_a = e_s ( T_{wet} ) - \gamma \left( T_{dry} - T_{wet} \right)$

here e_{s}(T) is saturation vapor pressure as a function of temperature, T.

T_{dew} = the dewpoint temperature at which water condenses.
T_{wet} = the temperature of a wet thermometer bulb from which water can evaporate to air.
T_{dry} = the temperature of a dry thermometer bulb in air.
