= Evapotranspiration =

Natural processes of water movement within the water cycle

Water cycle of the Earth's surface, showing the individual components of transpiration and evaporation that make up evapotranspiration. Other closely related processes shown are runoff and groundwater recharge.

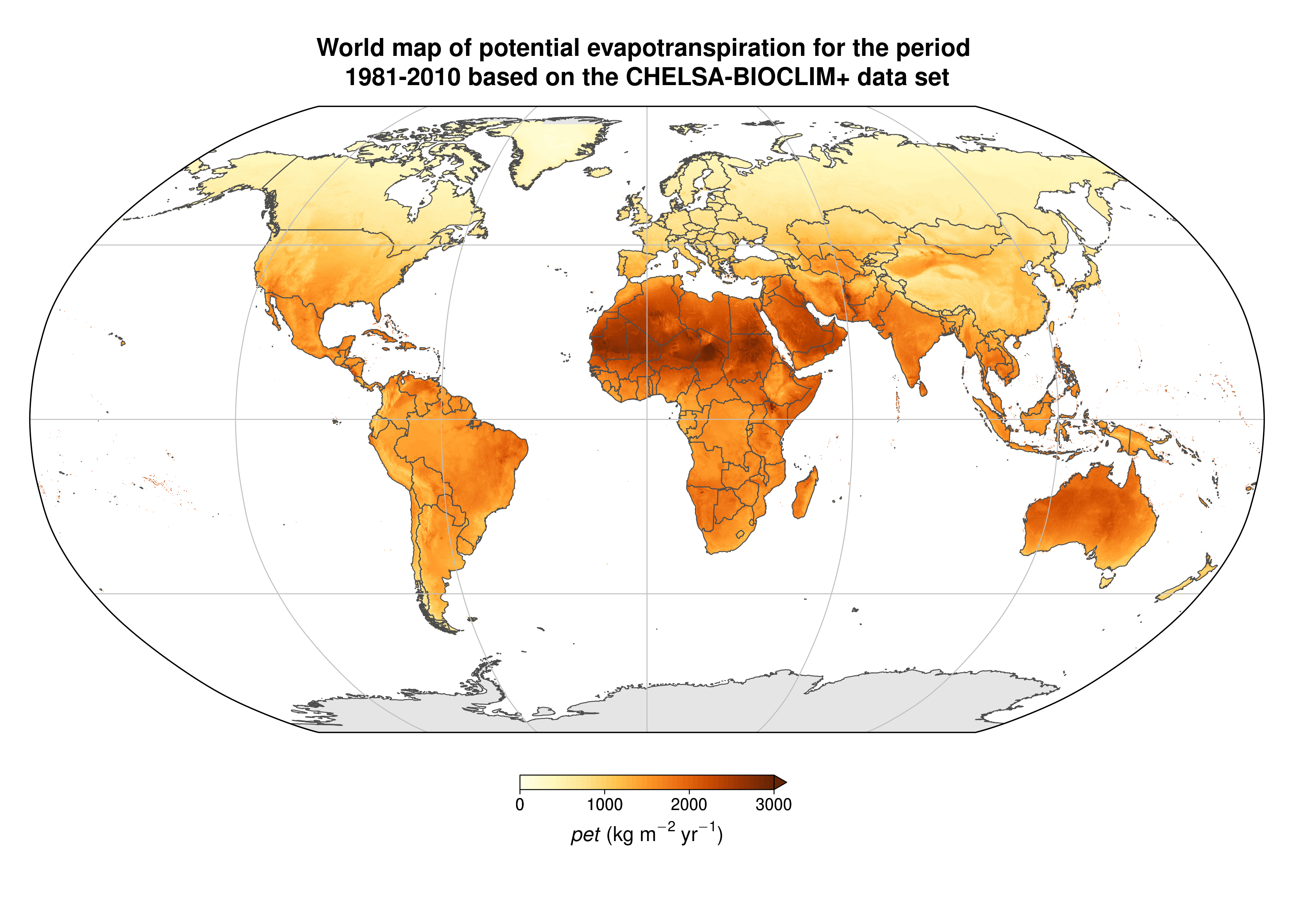
Global distribution of potential evapotranspiration averaged over the years 1981–2010 from the CHELSA-BIOCLIM+ data set

Evapotranspiration (ET) refers to the combined processes that move water from the Earth's surface (open water and ice surfaces, bare soil and vegetation) into the atmosphere, including both evaporation and transpiration. Evapotranspiration is an important part of the local water cycle and climate, and measurement of it plays a key role in water resource management and agricultural irrigation.

== Definition ==
Evapotranspiration is defined as: "The combined processes through which water is transferred to the atmosphere from open water and ice surfaces, bare soil and vegetation that make up the Earth's surface."

Evapotranspiration is a combination of evaporation and transpiration, measured in order to better understand crop water requirements, irrigation scheduling, and watershed management. The two key components of evapotranspiration are:

- Evaporation: the movement of water directly to the air from sources such as the soil and water bodies. It can be affected by factors including heat, humidity, solar radiation and wind speed.
- Transpiration: the movement of water from root systems, through a plant, and exit into the air as water vapor. This exit occurs through stomata in the plant. Rate of transpiration can be influenced by factors including plant type, soil type, weather conditions and water content, and also cultivation practices.

Evapotranspiration is typically measured in millimeters of water (i.e. volume of water moved per unit area of the Earth's surface) in a set unit of time. Globally, it is estimated that on average between three-fifths and three-quarters of land precipitation is returned to the atmosphere via evapotranspiration.

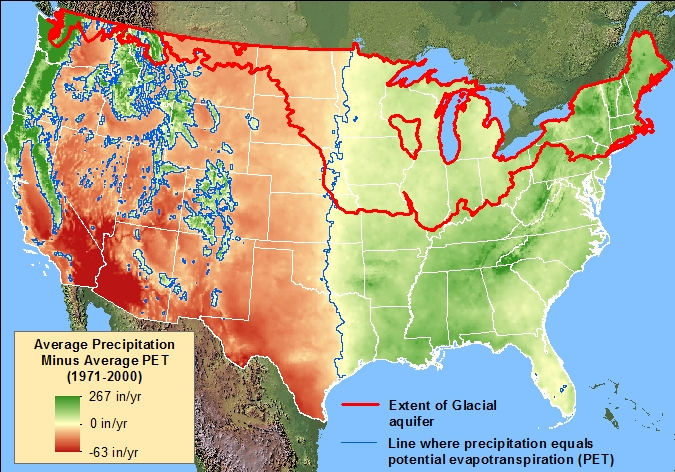
This map shows the difference in the Eastern and Western United States average evapotranspiration. Notice that where agricultural practices are dominant evapotranspiration is higher than average.

Evapotranspiration does not, in general, account for other mechanisms which are involved in returning water to the atmosphere, though some of these, such as snow and ice sublimation in regions of high elevation or high latitude, can make a large contribution to atmospheric moisture even under standard conditions.

== Influencing factors ==
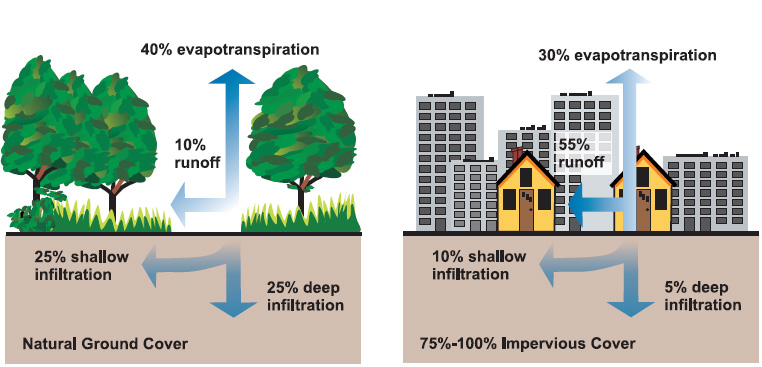
Diagram showing impact of ground cover on evapotranspiration and other water usage factors

=== Primary factors ===
Levels of evapotranspiration in a given area are primarily controlled by three factors: Firstly, the amount of water present which includes the amount of available water in both the soil and in larger bodies of water. Secondly, the amount of energy present in the air and soil (e.g. heat, measured by the global surface temperature); and thirdly the ability of the atmosphere to take up water (humidity) which can cause the air temperature to vary from location to location and therefore lead to an increase of decrease in total evapotranspiration.

Regarding the second factor (energy and heat): climate change has increased global temperatures (see instrumental temperature record). This global warming has increased evapotranspiration over land. The increased evapotranspiration is one of the effects of climate change on the water cycle.

=== Secondary factors ===
==== Vegetation type ====
Vegetation type impacts levels of evapotranspiration. For example, herbaceous plants generally transpire less than woody plants, because they usually have less extensive foliage. Also, plants with deep reaching roots can transpire water more constantly, because those roots can pull more water into the plant and leaves. Another example is that conifer forests tend to have higher rates of evapotranspiration than deciduous broadleaf forests, particularly in the dormant winter and early spring seasons, because they are evergreen. With crop vegetation being widespread, evapotranspiration may also be called "corn sweat".

==== Vegetation coverage ====
Transpiration is a larger component of evapotranspiration (relative to evaporation) in vegetation-abundant areas. As a result, denser vegetation, like forests, may increase evapotranspiration and reduce water yield. Vegetation coverage also leads to a reduction in the overall surface temperature and the way solar energy effects evapotranspiration rates. Through this, heat transfer can be facilitated faster between the atmosphere and the surface increasing evaporation rates. The density of vegetation coverage can control different environmental conditions of varying ecosystems and the way that water moves through the system. Different vegetation coverages control the conditions on transpiration, but the evapotranspiration process will vary from plant-to-plant base on individual features of the plant.

Two exceptions to this are cloud forests and rainforests. In cloud forests, trees collect the liquid water in fog or low clouds onto their surface, which eventually drips down to the ground. These trees still contribute to evapotranspiration, but often collect more water than they evaporate or transpire. In rainforests, water yield is increased (compared to cleared, unforested land in the same climatic zone) as evapotranspiration increases humidity within the forest (a portion of which condenses and returns quickly as precipitation experienced at ground level as rain). The density of the vegetation blocks sunlight and reduces temperatures at ground level (thereby reducing losses due to surface evaporation), and reduces wind speeds (thereby reducing the loss of airborne moisture). The combined effect results in increased surface stream flows and a higher ground water table whilst the rainforest is preserved. Clearing of rainforests frequently leads to desertification as ground level temperatures and wind speeds increase, vegetation cover is lost or intentionally destroyed by clearing and burning, soil moisture is reduced by wind, and soils are easily eroded by high wind and rainfall events.

==== Soil and irrigation ====
Areas that are highly irrigated have a higher amount of moisture that is consistent in the soil. Moisture content within the soil effects total evapotranspiration. Areas with lower moisture levels in the soil result in lower evapotranspiration interaction and will increase the surface temperature of the soil. Areas with higher moisture levels will have more effective evapotranspiration and decrease the surface temperature of the soil.An exception is areas with high water tables, where capillary action can cause water from the groundwater to rise through the soil matrix back to the surface. If potential evapotranspiration is greater than the actual precipitation, then soil will dry out until conditions stabilize, unless irrigation is used. More information about how evapotranspiration effects overall crop production will lead to the ability to better produce higher quality crops and increase our ability to sustainably irrigate our fields efficiently in large scale agricultural operations. It is shown that where irrigation systems are being implemented, fields and crops are seeing increased levels of evapotranspiration. While on the contrary in places where irrigation methods are not used lower evapotranspiration levels are seen. As the agriculture industry continues to evolve, new agricultural technologies and fertilizers are leading to an increase in evapotranspiration rates.

== Measurements ==
=== Direct measurement ===
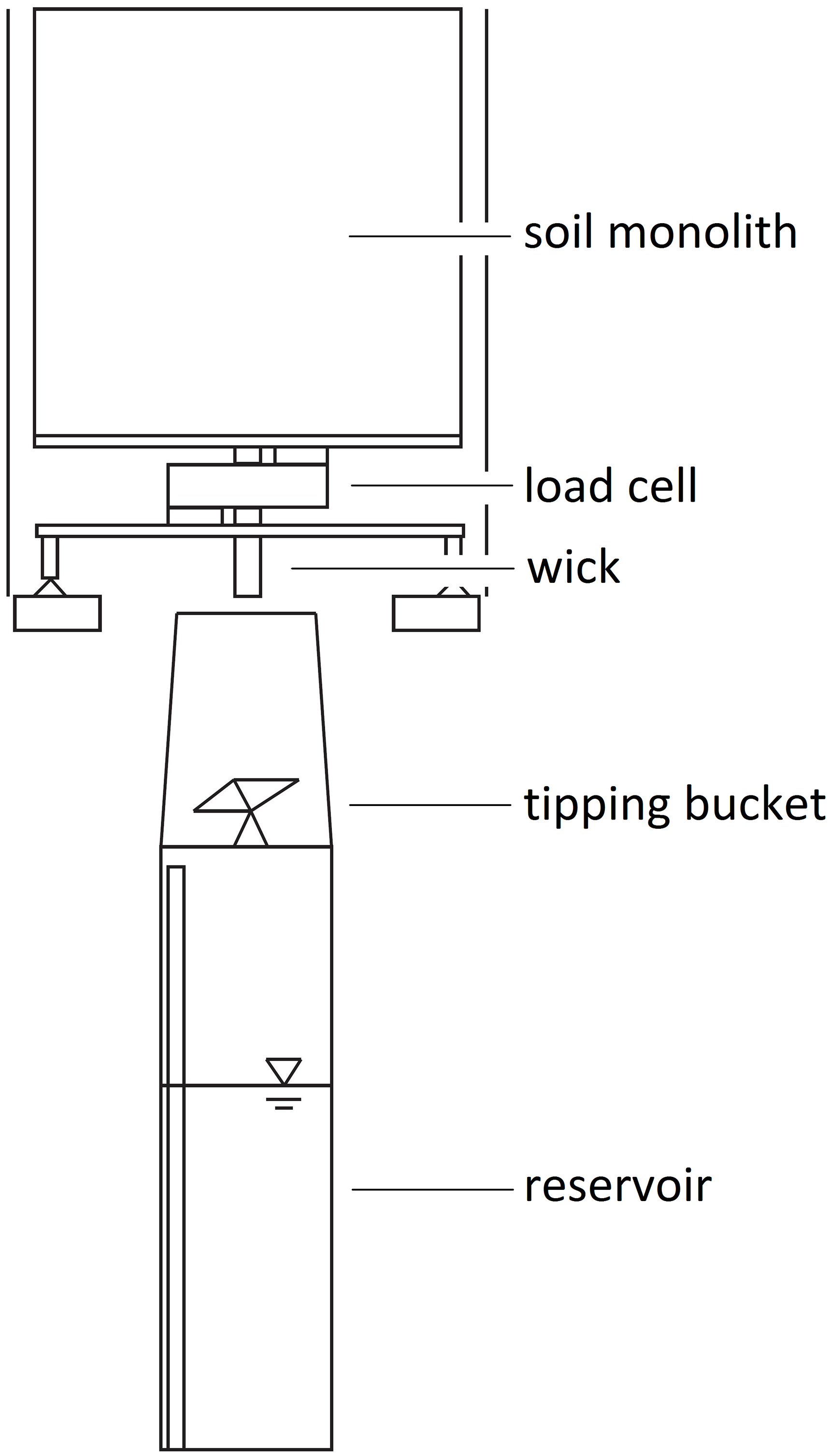
Design for a lysimeter

Evapotranspiration can be measured directly with a weighing or pan lysimeter. A lysimeter continuously measures the weight of a plant and associated soil, and any water added by precipitation or irrigation. The change in storage of water in the soil is then modeled by measuring the change in weight. When used properly, this allows for precise measurement of evapotranspiration over small areas.

=== Indirect estimation ===
Because atmospheric vapor flux is difficult or time-consuming to measure directly, evapotranspiration is typically estimated by one of several different methods that do not rely on direct measurement.

==== Catchment water balance ====
Evapotranspiration may be estimated by evaluating the water balance equation for a given area:. The water balance equation relates the change in water stored within the basin (S) to its input and outputs:

$\Delta S = P - ET - Q - D \,\!$

In the equation, the change in water stored within the basin (ΔS) is related to precipitation (P) (water going into the basin), and evapotranspiration (ET), streamflow (Q), and groundwater recharge (D) (water leaving the basin). By rearranging the equation, ET can be estimated if values for the other variables are known:

$ET = P -\Delta S - Q - D \,\!$

==== Energy balance ====
A second methodology for estimation is by calculating the energy balance.

$\lambda E = R_n - G - H \,\!$

where λE is the energy needed to change the phase of water from liquid to gas, R_{n} is the net radiation, G is the soil heat flux and H is the sensible heat flux. Using instruments like a scintillometer, soil heat flux plates or radiation meters, the components of the energy balance can be calculated and the energy available for actual evapotranspiration can be solved.

The SEBAL and METRIC algorithms solve for the energy balance at the Earth's surface using satellite imagery. This allows for both actual and potential evapotranspiration to be calculated on a pixel-by-pixel basis. Evapotranspiration is a key indicator for water management and irrigation performance. SEBAL and METRIC can map these key indicators in time and space, for days, weeks or years.

==== Estimation from meteorological data ====
Given meteorological data like wind, temperature, and humidity, reference ET can be calculated. The most general and widely used equation for calculating reference ET is the Penman equation. The Penman–Monteith variation is recommended by the Food and Agriculture Organization and the American Society of Civil Engineers. The simpler Blaney–Criddle equation was popular in the Western United States for many years but it is not as accurate in wet regions with higher humidity. Other equations for estimating evapotranspiration from meteorological data include the Makkink equation, which is simple but must be calibrated to a specific location, and the Hargreaves equations.

To convert the reference evapotranspiration to the actual crop evapotranspiration, a crop coefficient and a stress coefficient must be used. Crop coefficients, as used in many hydrological models, usually change over the year because crops are seasonal and, in general, plant behaviour varies over the year: perennial plants mature over multiple seasons, while annuals do not survive more than a few, so stress responses can significantly depend upon many aspects of plant type and condition.

== Potential evapotranspiration ==
This animation shows the projected increase in potential evaporation in North America through the year 2100, relative to 1980, based on the combined results of multiple climate models.

Potential evapotranspiration (PET) or potential evaporation (PE) is the amount of water that would be evaporated and transpired by a specific crop, soil or ecosystem if there was sufficient water available. It is a reflection of the energy available to evaporate or transpire water, and of the wind available to transport the water vapor from the ground up into the lower atmosphere and away from the initial location. Potential evapotranspiration is expressed in terms of a depth of water or soil moisture percentage.

If the actual evapotranspiration (AET) is considered the net result of atmospheric demand for moisture from a surface and the ability of the surface to supply moisture, then PET is a measure of the demand side (also called evaporative demand). Surface and air temperatures, insolation, and wind all affect this. A dryland is a place where annual potential evaporation exceeds annual precipitation.

Often a value for the potential evapotranspiration is calculated at a nearby climatic station on a reference surface, conventionally on land dominated by short grass (though this may differ from station to station). This value is called the reference evapotranspiration (ET_{0}). Actual evapotranspiration is said to equal potential evapotranspiration when there is ample water present. Evapotranspiration can never be greater than potential evapotranspiration, but can be lower if there is not enough water to be evaporated or plants are unable to transpire maturely and readily. Some US states utilize a full cover alfalfa reference crop that is 0.5 m (1.6 ft) in height, rather than the general short green grass reference, due to the higher value of ET from the alfalfa reference.

Potential evapotranspiration is higher in the summer, on clearer and less cloudy days, and closer to the equator, because of the higher levels of solar radiation that provides the energy (heat) for evaporation. Potential evapotranspiration is also higher on windy days because the evaporated moisture can be quickly moved from the ground or plant surface before it precipitates, allowing more evaporation to fill its place.

== List of remote sensing based evapotranspiration models ==
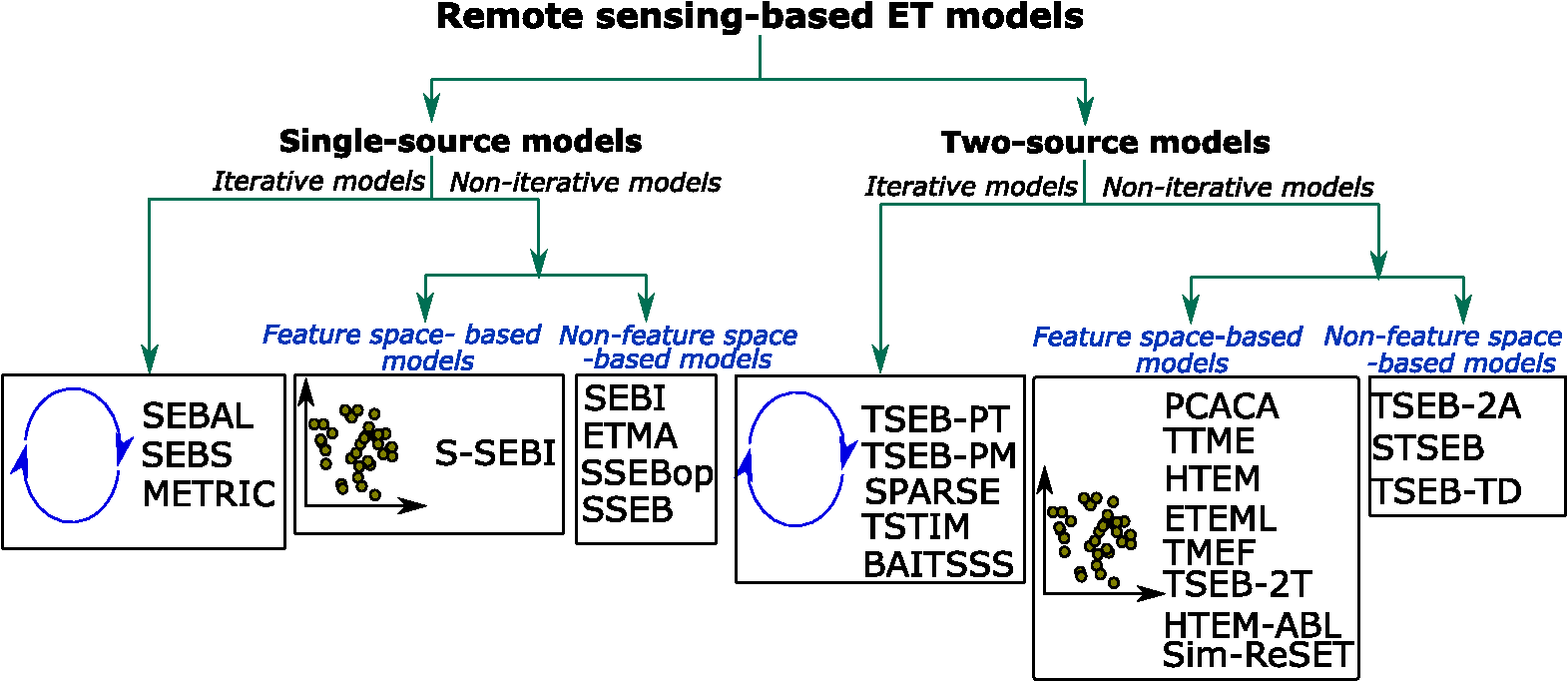
Classification of RS-based ET models based on sensible heat flux estimation approaches

- ALEXI
- BAITSSS
- METRIC
- Abtew Method
- SEBAL
- SEBS
- SSEBop
- PT-JPL
- ETMonitor
- ETLook
- ETWatch

== See also ==
- Eddy covariance flux (aka eddy correlation, eddy flux)
- Effects of climate change on the water cycle
- Hydrology (agriculture)
- Hydrologic Evaluation of Landfill Performance (HELP)
- Latent heat flux
- Water Evaluation And Planning system (WEAP)
- Soil plant atmosphere continuum
- Deficit irrigation
- Biotic pump

== Sources ==
- Remote sensing determination of evapotranspiration. FAO. 2023. doi:10.4060/cc8150en. ISBN 978-92-5-138242-4.
- Goyal, Megh R.; Harmsen, Eric W., eds. (2013). Evapotranspiration. doi:10.1201/b15779. ISBN 978-0-429-16135-3.
- Intergovernmental Panel on Climate Change (2023a). "Glossary". Climate Change 2022 – Impacts, Adaptation and Vulnerability. pp. 2897–2930. doi:10.1017/9781009325844.029. ISBN 978-1-009-32584-4.
- Intergovernmental Panel on Climate Change (2023b). "Water Cycle Changes". Climate Change 2021 – the Physical Science Basis. pp. 1055–1210. doi:10.1017/9781009157896.010. ISBN 978-1-009-15789-6.
- Allen, Richard G; Pereira, Luis S; Raes, Dirk; Smith, Martin (1998). Crop Evapotranspiration: Guidelines for Computing Crop Water Requirements. FAO Irrigation and drainage paper 56. Rome, Italy: Food and Agriculture Organization of the United Nations. ISBN 978-92-5-104219-9.
