= Irrigation in Iran =

Irrigation in Iran covers 89,930 km^{2} making it the fifth ranked country in terms of irrigated area.

== Tidal irrigation at Abadan island, Iran ==
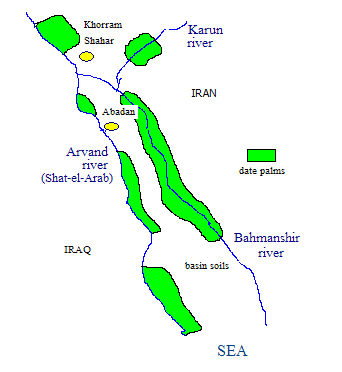
Fig. 1 Sketch of the Abadan island showing rivers and date palm plantations

The Abadan Island (Fig. 1) in Khūzestān Province is situated between the Arvand and Bahmanshir rivers. The Arvand river (in Arabic: Shatt al-Arab) forms the boundary between Iran and Iraq and collects the waters from the Euphrates and Tigris rivers. On the island orchards of date palm are found on tidal irrigation in the desert climate, although many date palms were destroyed during the Iran–Iraq War.

=== Palm tree belt ===
The palm tree belt stretches along the Arvand River from Abadan south-east over a distance of about 40 km and is bounded in the interior by a road.

=== Tidal canals ===
A sketch of the system of tidal canals is shown in figure 2. They are 2 to 6 km long depending on the topography and spaced at 50 to 60 m.

The tidal canals cut through and serve the levee soils along the river (Fig. 3) and they stop where the basin soils of the backswamps begin.

Field channels originate from the lateral ditches at a spacing of 10 to 12 m and the date palms are planted along these (Fig. 4).

=== Soil properties ===
The typical properties of the levee soils are shown in figure 5.

=== Simulation tidal propagation ===
The tidal movements are 2 m on average. A simulation of tidal fluctuations in the ditches is shown in figure 6 for an average and a high river discharge at various distances from the sea. The simulations were made with the Duflow model.

=== Gallery ===
Gallery of figures referred to in the text

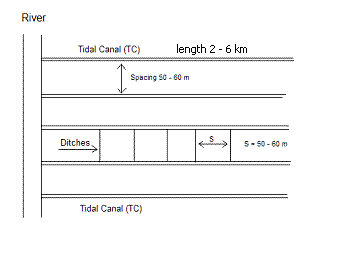
Fig. 2. A tidal canal stretches from the river inland and distributes the water over the lateral ditches

Fig. 3. Longitudinal section of a tidal canal and cross-section through the river levee

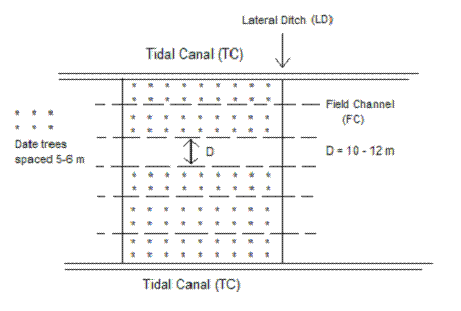
Fig. 4. The field channels run between the lateral ditches

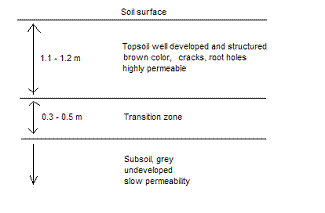
Fig. 5. An impression of soil properties

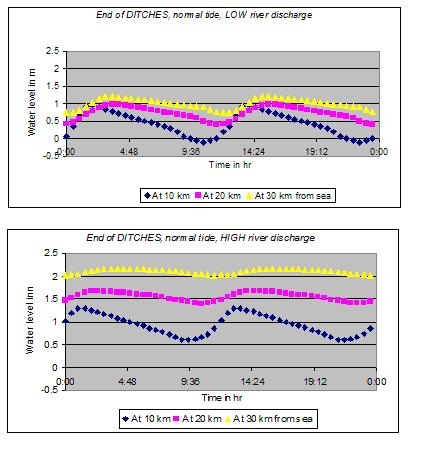
Fig. 6. Simulated tidal movements in canals at different river discharges and at various distances from the sea, assuming a normal tidal range

== Irrigation of the Garmsar alluvial fan ==
Reference: Irrigation, groundwater, drainage and soil salinity control in the alluvial fan of Garmsar

The irrigation system for the alluvial fan of Garmsar is quite well developed (Fig. G1, below), to the extent that lined canals have been made and a belt-canal crosses the fan through its middle.

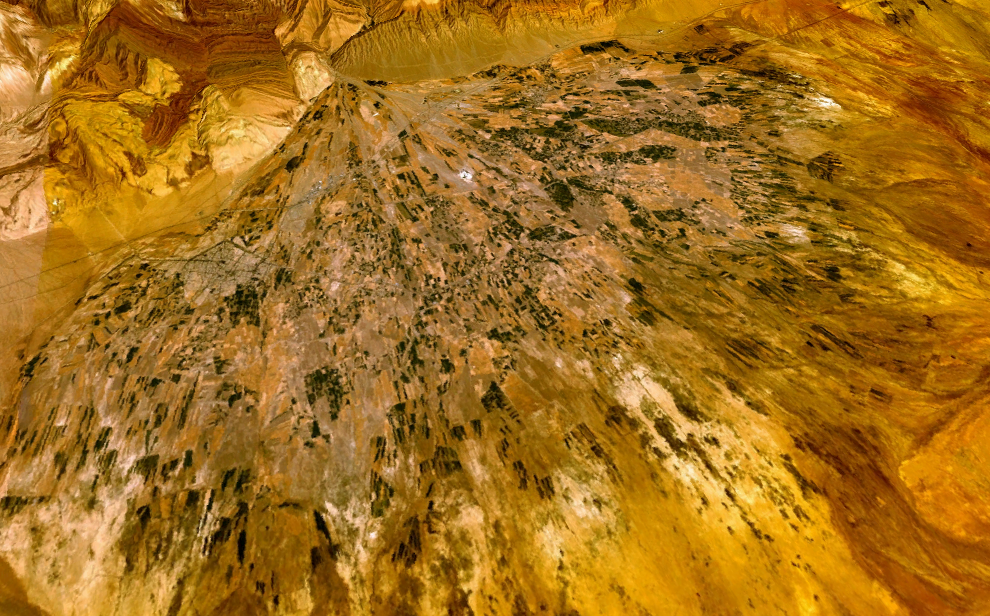
The fairly large alluvial fan of Garmsar is fed by the Hableh Rud (river) with an important catchment area in the high Alburz mountain range. The river carries a large amount of water during the rainy season, otherwise the discharge is low.

An estimated average annual water balance is shown in Fig. G2 (below). It is seen that the storage of irrigation losses in the aquifer plays an important role. In the dry season the groundwater is used for irrigation by pumping from deep wells. A cross-section of the groundwater situation is shown in Fig. G3 (below).

The water rights are expressed in sang, a measure of continuous flow of about 10 L/s, but in practice it varies from 10 to more than 15 L/s. The water is delivered to about 100 tertiary units (often a village), within which the water is distributed by 12-day rotations amongst the farmers who each are entitled to receive the authorized sangs for a fixed number of hours during each rotation period. The village communities are, at the same time, water-user associations who take care of the water-distribution within the tertiary unit and they maintain the tertiary canals.

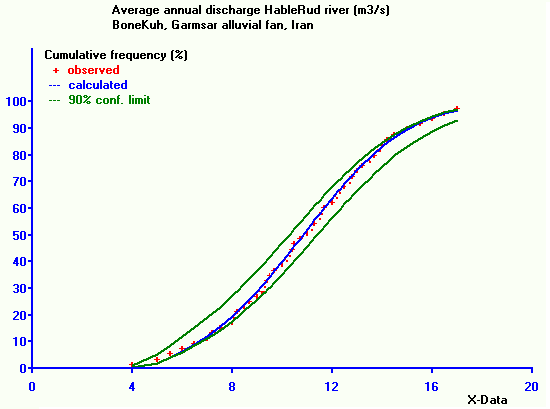
Cumulative frequency distribution of the annual average river discharge, showing a large variation.

At present, the distribution of surface irrigation water to the villages is determined by the Garmsar Water Authority on the basis of the water rights and verbal agreements and communications with the water users in the absence of a written manual. The fair distribution of the irrigation water is not an easy job as the average annual river discharge is quite variable in the range of 5 to 20 m3/s (see graph at the right).

The deep tube-wells are privately owned. The drilling of wells is subject to license. Recently, the licensing has stopped for fear of over-exploitation of the aquifer. It appears that no operational rules are applied to the wells. In the fringe lands, the water table is shallow.

To stabilize the agriculture in the fringe lands, which are threatened by soil salinization, a method of strip-cropping (Fig. G4) can be recommended for soil salinity control.

Illustrations of the Garmsar alluvial fan

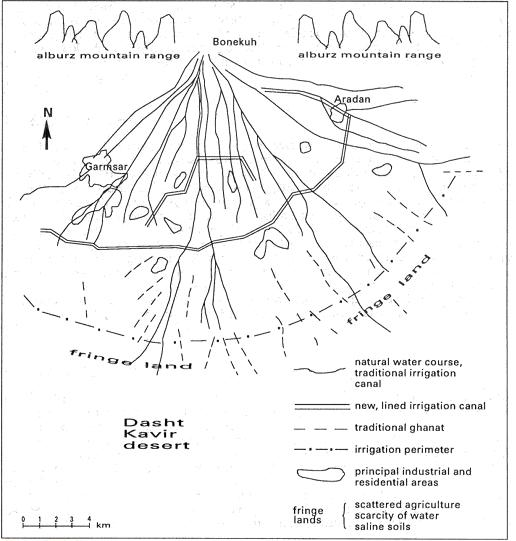
Fig. G1. Map of the Garmsar area showing irrigation systems

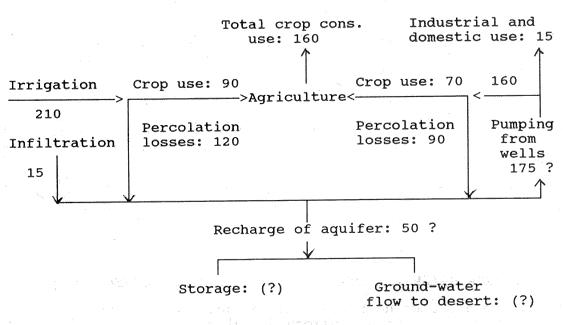
Fig. G2. Irrigation and groundwater balances, estimated annual average in MCM

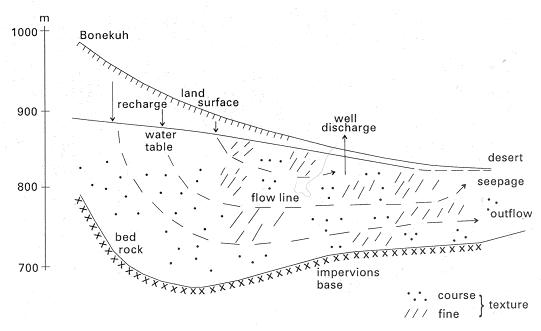
Fig. G3. Cross-section through the aquifer showing the geohydrologic conditions

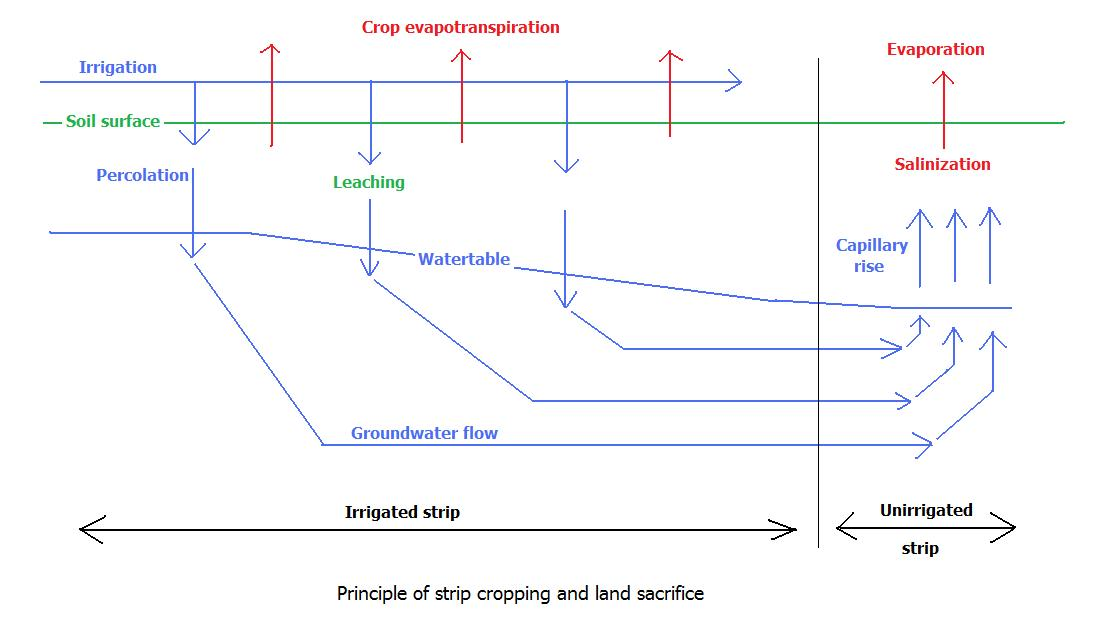
Fig. G4. Principle of strip-cropping and sacrifice of the permanently unirrigated strips to where the soil salinization is directed.

== Transfer from Persian Gulf ==
As of 2021, Pipeline transport lines links (using desalination techniques) Persian Gulf to Yazd in central Iran. Other similar projects have been launched linking Isfahan, Mashhad or Zahedan to littoral water sources.

== Project to transfer Caspian Sea water to central regions ==
According to the plan, water will be transferred from Sari to the city of Semnan within 24 months (starting April 2012). The plan aims to provide central provinces with water for industrial and agricultural purposes at a cost of $1.5 billion. Once the plan comes on stream, some 500 million cubic meters of water will be transferred per annum. After desalination at the point of origin in the Caspian Sea, it will be transported through a 500-kilometer-long (300 mi) pipeline to the central Kavir desert, bringing about 200 million cubic meters (7,062 cubic feet) of water per year.

Nearly 14 percent Iran's territory is desert and suffers from prolonged droughts.

The Caspian Sea is shared by Iran, Russia, Kazakhstan, Azerbaijan and Turkmenistan. Its salinity is about a third of that of sea water.

== See also ==
- Water supply and sanitation in Iran
- Agriculture in Iran
- List of reservoirs and dams in Iran
- List of countries by irrigated land area
