= Irrigation (disambiguation) =

Irrigation is the artificial application of water to the land, soil or surfaces.

Irrigation may also refer to:

== Agriculture ==
- Drip irrigation, slow watering of roots
- Lift irrigation, irrigation where water is lifted using pumps or other means
- Surface irrigation, irrigation where water is applied using gravity
- Tidal irrigation, irrigation by river water under tidal influence
- Irrigation in viticulture, use of irrigation in wine-making

== Health ==
- Nasal irrigation, cleansing of the nose with water
- Therapeutic irrigation, cleansing with water in medicine

== See also ==
- Irrigation management
