= List of countries by irrigated land area =

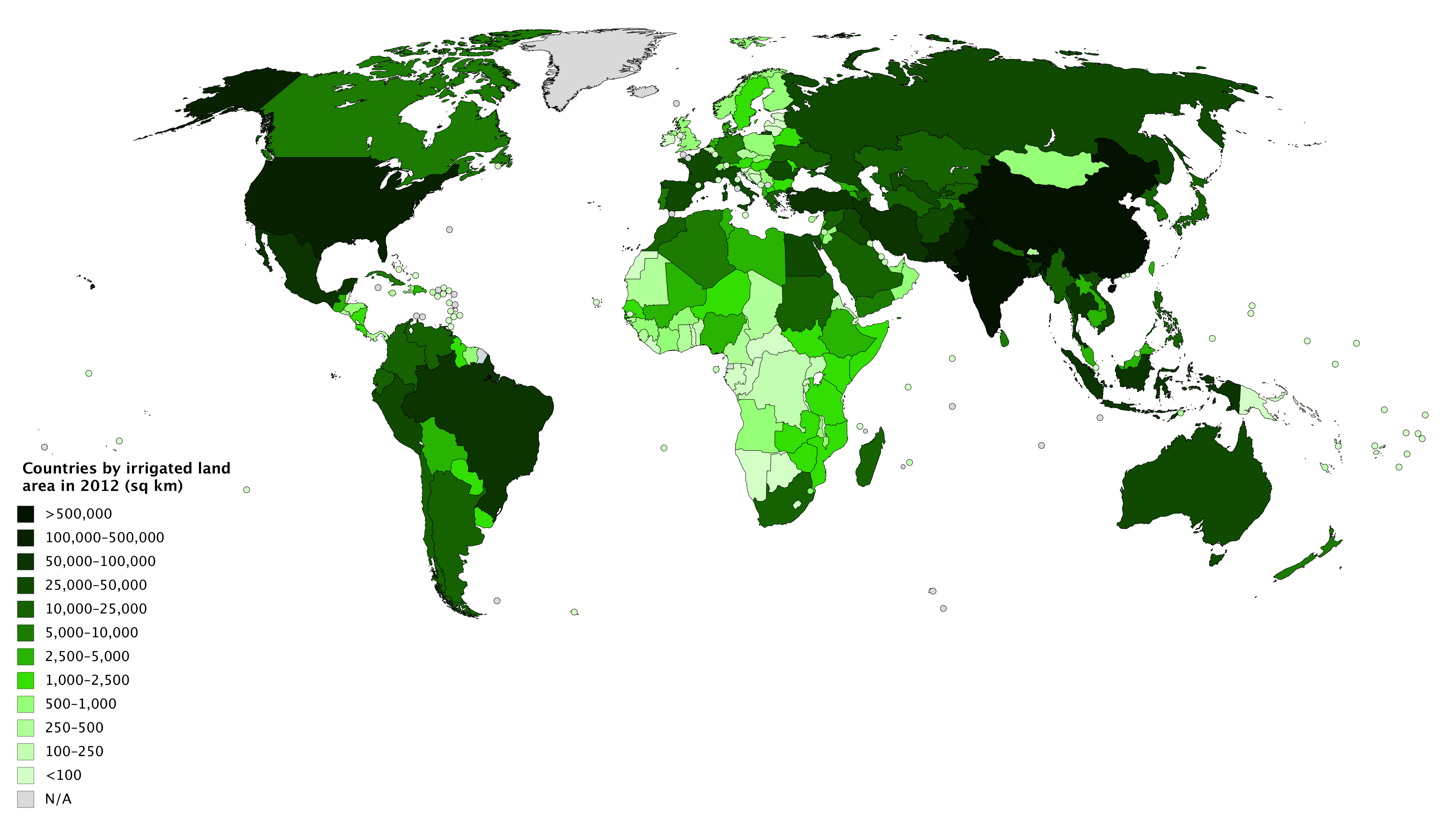
Countries by irrigated land area in 2012. Countries/territories shown with irrigated land area as '0' are shaded with the '<100' colour (lightest green); those with no data are shaded with the 'N/A' colour (grey).

This is a list of countries by irrigated land area based on The World Factbook of the Central Intelligence Agency. The two countries with the largest irrigated land area are India and China, which make up 22.06% and 21.33% of worldwide irrigated land area respectively as of 2020. Sorting is in alphabetical order.

Country/Territory/Region	Irrigated land (km^{2})	Date of information
World	3,242,917	2012 est.
Afghanistan	24,930	2020
Albania	1,820	2020
Algeria	12,605	2016
American Samoa	0	2022
Andorra	0	2022
Angola	860	2014
Anguilla	0	2020
Antigua and Barbuda	1.3	2012
Argentina	23,600	2012
Armenia	1,554	2020
Australia	15,210	2020
Austria	382	2016
Azerbaijan	14,649	2020
Bahamas, The	10	2012
Bahrain	40	2012
Bangladesh	81,270	2020
Barbados	50	2012
Belarus	303	2020
Belgium	57	2013
Belize	35	2012
Benin	172	2017
Bhutan	320	2012
Bolivia	2,972	2017
Bosnia and Herzegovina	30	2012
Botswana	25	2014
Brazil	69,029	2017
Brunei	10	2012
Bulgaria	987	2013
Burkina Faso	550	2016
Burma	17,140	2020
Burundi	230	2012
Cabo Verde	35	2012
Cambodia	3,540	2012
Cameroon	290	2012
Canada	9,045	2015
Central African Republic	10	2012
Chad	300	2012
Chile	11,100	2012
China	691,600	2020
Colombia	10,900	2012
Comoros	1.3	2012
Congo, Democratic Republic of the	110	2012
Congo, Republic of the	20	2012
Costa Rica	1,015	2012
Cote d'Ivoire	730	2012
Croatia	171	2020
Cuba	8,700	2012
Cyprus	268	2020
Czech Republic	220	2020
Denmark	2,360	2020
Djibouti	10	2012
Dominican Republic	2,980	2018
Ecuador	10,000	2020
Egypt	36,500	2012
El Salvador	274	2020
Eritrea	210	2012
Estonia	20	2016
Eswatini	500	2012
Ethiopia	1,813	2020
European Union	154,540	2011 est.
Fiji	40	2012
Finland	80	2015
France	14,236	2013
French Polynesia	10	2012
Gabon	40	2012
Gambia, The	50	2012
Georgia	4,330	2012
Germany	5,056	2020
Ghana	360	2013
Greece	11,853	2019
Grenada	20	2012
Guam	2	2012
Guatemala	3,375	2012
Guinea	950	2012
Guinea-Bissau	250	2012
Guyana	1,430	2012
Haiti	800	2013
Honduras	900	2012
Hong Kong	10	2012
Hungary	1,010	2019
Iceland	0.5	2020
India	715,539	2020
Indonesia	91,360	2020
Iran	79,721	2020
Iraq	35,250	2012
Ireland	0	2022
Isle of Man	0	2022
Israel	2,159	2020
Italy	26,010	2013
Jamaica	250	2012
Jan Mayen	0	2022
Japan	15,730	2014
Jordan	833	2020
Kazakhstan	18,099	2020
Kenya	1,030	2012
Kiribati	0	2022
Korea, North	14,600	2012
Korea, South	7,780	2012
Kuwait	100	2015
Kyrgyzstan	10,043	2020
Laos	4,409	2020
Latvia	6	2016 (Note: Land in Latvia is often too wet and in need of drainage not irrigation; approximately 16,000 sq km or 85% of agricultural land has been improved by drainage)
Lebanon	1,040	2012
Lesotho	12	2013
Liberia	30	2012
Libya	4,700	2012
Liechtenstein	0	2012
Lithuania	16	2013
Luxembourg	0	2012
Macau	0	2012
Madagascar	10,860	2012
Malawi	740	2012
Malaysia	4,420	2020
Maldives	0	2012
Mali	3,780	2012
Malta	35	2020
Marshall Islands	0	2022
Mauritania	450	2012
Mauritius	158	2020
Mexico	60,620	2020
Micronesia, Federated States of	0	2022
Moldova	2,155	2020
Monaco	0	2022
Mongolia	602	2020
Montenegro	24	2012
Montserrat	0	2022
Morocco	17,645	2019
Mozambique	1,180	2012
Namibia	80	2012
Nauru	0	2022
Nepal	13,320	2012
Netherlands	2,969	2019
New Caledonia	100	2012
New Zealand	7,000	2014
Nicaragua	1,990	2012
Niger	2,666	2020
Nigeria	2,930	2012
Niue	0	2022
Norfolk Island	0	2022
North Macedonia	844	2016
Northern Mariana Islands	1	2012
Norway	337	2016
Oman	1,079	2020
Pakistan	193,400	2020
Palau	0	2022
Panama	407	2020
Papua New Guinea	0	2022
Paracel Islands	0	2022
Paraguay	1,362	2012
Peru	25,800	2012
Philippines	16,270	2012
Pitcairn Islands	0	2022
Poland	760	2013
Portugal	5,662	2019
Puerto Rico	220	2012
Qatar	130	2020
Romania	4,730	2020
Russia	43,000	2012
Rwanda	96	2012
Saint Helena, Ascension, and Tristan da Cunha	0	2022
Saint Kitts and Nevis	8	2012
Saint Lucia	30	2012
Saint Pierre and Miquelon	0	2022
Saint Vincent and the Grenadines	10	2012
Samoa	0	2022
San Marino	0	2022
Sao Tome and Principe	100	2012
Saudi Arabia	11,910	2018
Senegal	1,200	2012
Serbia	520	2020
Seychelles	3	2012
Sierra Leone	300	2012
Singapore	0	2022
Slovakia	211	2015
Slovenia	39	2020
Solomon Islands	0	2022
Somalia	2,000	2012
South Africa	16,700	2012
South Georgia and South Sandwich Islands	0	2022
South Sudan	1,000	2012
Spain	37,593	2020
Sri Lanka	5,700	2012
Sudan	15,666	2020
Suriname	600	2020
Sweden	519	2013
Switzerland	327	2016
Syria	13,100	2013
Taiwan	3,820	2012
Tajikistan	5,690	2020
Tanzania	1,840	2012
Thailand	64,150	2012
Timor-Leste	350	2012
Togo	70	2012
Tokelau	0	2022
Tonga	0	2022
Trinidad and Tobago	70	2012
Tunisia	3,920	2013
Turkey	52,150	2020
Turkmenistan	19,950	2012
Turks and Caicos Islands	0	2022
Tuvalu	0	2022
Uganda	105	2013
Ukraine	4,350	2020
United Arab Emirates	898	2020
United Kingdom	718	2018
United States	234,782	2017
Uruguay	2,380	2012
Uzbekistan	37,320	2020
Vanuatu	0	2022
Venezuela	10,550	2012
Vietnam	46,000	2012
Virgin Islands (U.S.)	1	2012
Wake Island	0	2022
Wallis and Futuna	0.6	2020
West Bank and Gaza Strip	151	2013
Yemen	6,800	2012
Zambia	1,560	2012
Zimbabwe	1,740	2012

== See also ==
- Gezira Scheme
- Irrigation
- Irrigation district
- Irrigation environmental impacts
- Irrigation management
- Irrigation statistics
- Lift irrigation schemes
- Paddy field
- Qanat
- Surface irrigation
- Tidal irrigation
