= Irrigation statistics =

This page shows statistical data on irrigation of agricultural lands worldwide.
Irrigation is the artificial abstraction of water from a source followed by the distribution of it at scheme level aiming at application at field level to enhance crop production when rainfall is scarce.

== Irrigated area ==
The appended table gives an overview of irrigated areas in the world in 2003
Only the countries with more than 10 million ha of irrigated land are mentioned.

	Area (10^{6} ha)
India	57
China	54
Pakistan	19
Asia (*)	188
United States	22
World	277

(*) Including India, China and Pakistan

There are 4 countries with 5 to 10 million ha irrigated land: Iran (7.7), Mexico (6.3), Turkey (5.1), and Thailand (5.0).

The 16 countries with 2 to 5 million ha irrigated land are: Bangladesh (4.7), Indonesia (4.5), Russia (4.5), Uzbekistan (4.3), Spain (3.8), Brazil (3.5), Iraq (3.5), Egypt (3.4), Romania (3.0), Vietnam (3.0), Italy (2.8), France (2.6), Japan (2.6), Australia (2.6), Ukraine (2.3), and Kazakhstan (2.1)

- See also List of countries by irrigated land area

== Area per application method at field level ==
94% of the application methods of irrigation water at field level is of the category surface irrigation, whereby the water is spread over the field by gravity.

Of the remaining 6%, the majority is irrigated by methods requiring energy, expensive hydraulic pressure techniques and pipe systems like sprinkler irrigation and drip irrigation, for the major part in the USA. The source of irrigation water in these cases often is groundwater from aquifers. However, the exploitation of aquifers can also be combined with surface irrigation at field level.

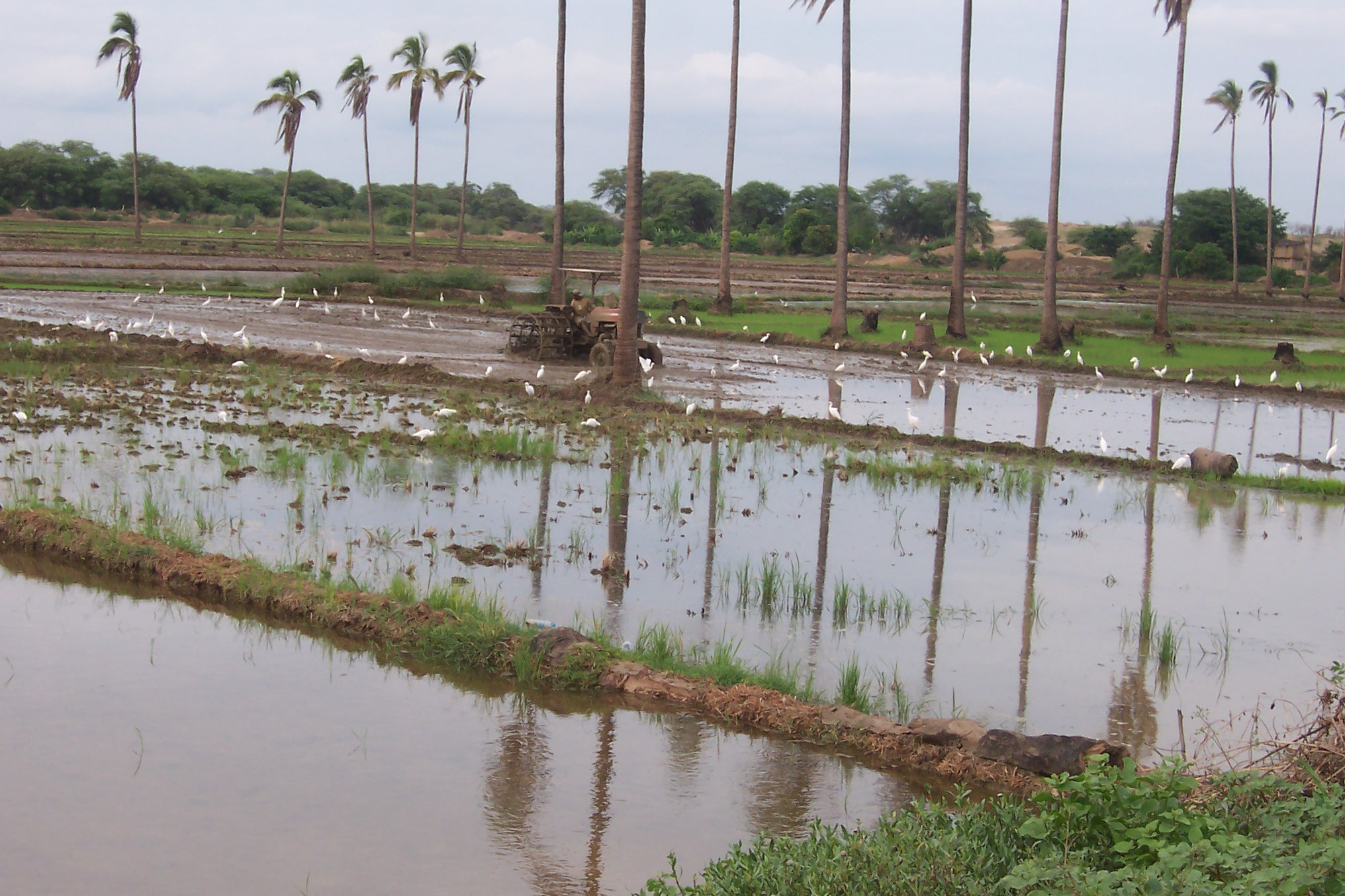
Basin irrigation for a rice crop

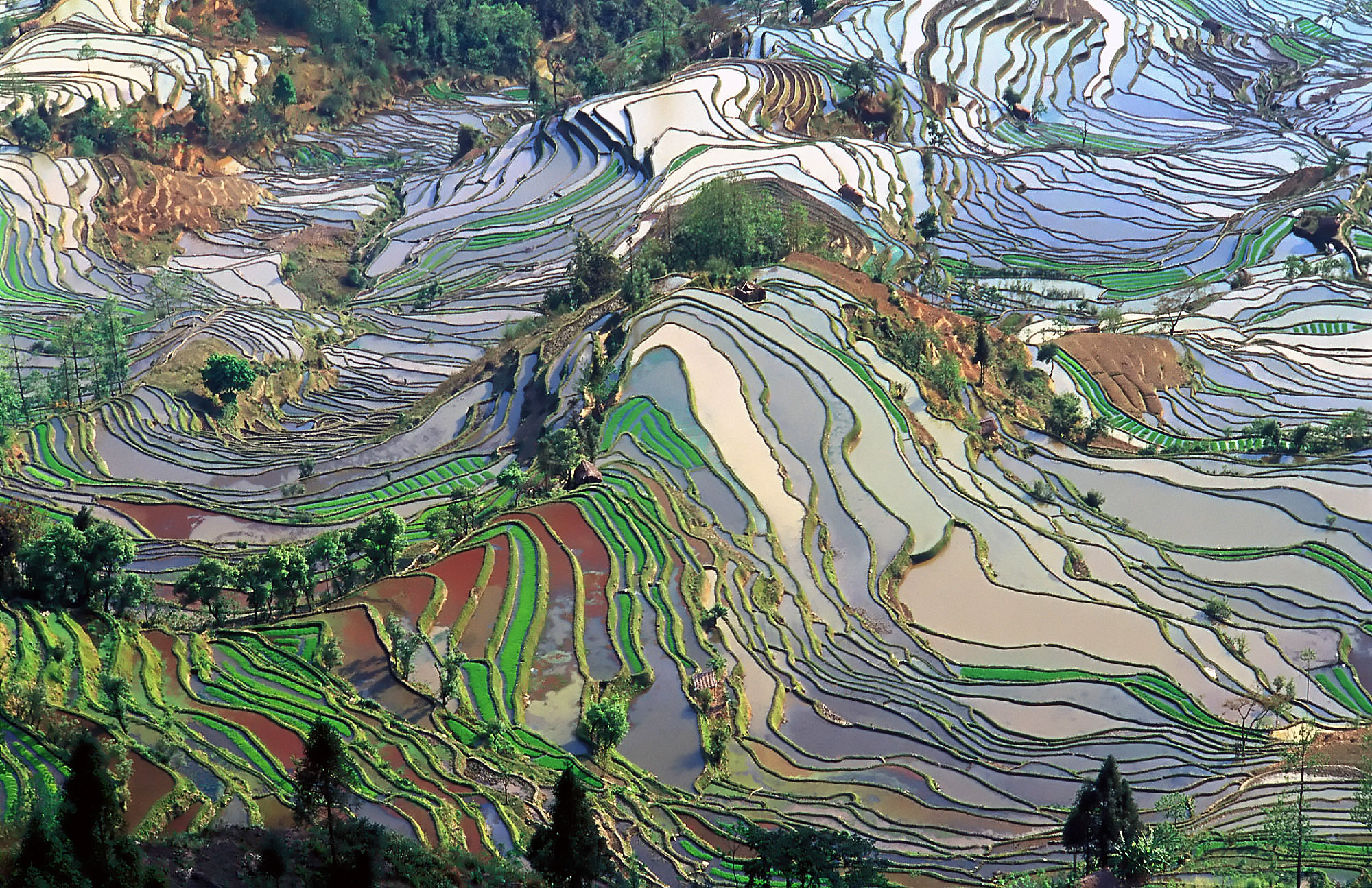
Terraced rice fields in Yunnan province, China.

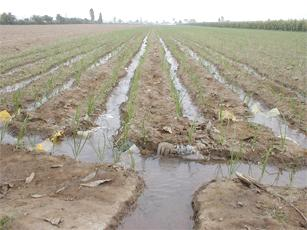
Furrow irrigation

In relatively small areas one applies subirrigation whereby the water infiltrates into the soil below the soil surface from pipes or ditches. This category includes tidal irrigation used in the lower part of rivers where the tidal influence is felt by permitting the river water to enter ditches at high tide and allowing it to infiltrate from there into the soil

In relatively rare cases one uses labor-intensive methods like irrigation with watering-cans and by filling dug-in porous pots (pitcher irrigation) from where the water enters the soil by capillary suction.

Surface irrigation can be divided into the following types, based on the method by which water is spread over the field after it has been admitted through the inlet:

- spate irrigation (in Pakistan called Rod Koh), which may occur in hilly regions in dry zones where small rivers produce spate floods; ditches and bunds are built to guide the water to the fields to be irrigated; the number of fields irrigated at each flood event depends on the duration and intensity of the flood. The sailaba system in Balochistan is an example
- flood-plain irrigation, which may occur in dry zones in larger river plains, where the river has high discharges during a short season only. Bunds are constructed to retain the river floods and the lands are being planted to crops when the floods recede (flood recession cropping). The molapos in the Okavango inland delta are an example
- border-strip irrigation, in which the water moves over a graded strip of land with a mild slope and the water infiltrates into the soil while the wetting front advances. Borders are made along the strip to prevent the water of spreading out to neighboring fields.
- level-basin irrigation, in which the water is set up on the soil surface quickly on leveled plots and given time to infiltrate. The basins are surrounded by borders to retain the water. Basins can be used for any crop. The combination of basins with furrows without slope is applied for relatively large plants like cotton, maize and sugar cane. For crops sown by broadcast, like some cereals (especially wheat), one uses basins with corrugations drawn in the soil. In orchards one may make relative small (possibly circular) basins around the trees. Basin irrigation can be used both in flat areas and sloping lands. In the latter case, terraces have to be made. The spectacular terraces pictured were made by hand, a tedious job, and they are an amazing world heritage. Rice grown in the flooded basins of terraces (paddies) is often irrigated continuously whereby the water flows from one field to the other, making sure that the rice plants remain submerged. The main reason of the submergence is weed control, but the rice needs to be of a variety that tolerates waterlogging.
- furrow irrigation, in which the water moves over the field in furrows between ridges on which the crop is planted. The water infiltrates into the soil from the furrows. The furrows can be made both in sloping and flat land. In steep sloping land they are preferably laid out at a mild slope at an angle with the topographic contour lines to avoid soil erosion.

The first four forms of irrigation come in the category of flood-irrigation, because the entire surface of the cropped area is wetted, whereas with furrow irrigation, the surface of the ridges remain dry. The irrigation of sloping fields is called flow irrigation as the water on the surface does not come to a stand still and the stream entering the field has to be cut back before the wetting front reaches the end of the field to avoid runoff losses.

== Areal growth ==
From 1955 to 1975 the annual growth of the irrigated area was almost 3%. From 1970 to 1982 the growth rate was some 2% per year, and from 1983 to 1994 about 1.3% per year. The growth rate of irrigated area is decreasing.

The following table shows the irrigation development in the world between 1955 and 1983, distinguishing developed from developing countries:

	1955		1983		Increase	
	10^{6} ha	% of WT	10^{6} ha	% of WT	10^{6} ha	% of 1955
Developed countries	28	23	61	29	33	118
Developing countries	93	77	152	71	59	63
World total (WT)	121	100	213	100	92	76
India+Pakistan	33	27	55	26	22	67
China	31	26	45	21	14	45

The developed countries witnessed a relatively greater increase than the developing nations.

== Water use ==
Irrigation schemes in the world use about 3 500 km^{3} water per year, of which 74% is evaporated by the crops. This is some 80% of all water used by mankind (4 400 km^{3} per year).
The water used for irrigation is roughly 25% of the annually available water resources (14 000 km^{3}) and 9% of all annual river discharges in the hydrological cycle.
River discharges occur for the major part in regions with humid climates, far removed from the regions with (semi)arid climates, where irrigation water is most needed. Compared to the 8 600 km^{3} of annual river discharge in the drier climates only, the yearly water use for irrigation is 40%

	irrigation use	all uses	usable resources	total supply
Quantity of water in km^{3}/year	3 500	4 400	14 000	40 000
Irrigation as a percentage (%)	80	100	25	9

Of the total irrigated area worldwide 38% is equipped for irrigation with groundwater, especially in India (39 million ha), China (19 million ha) and the United States of America (17 million ha). Total consumptive groundwater use for irrigation is estimated as 545 km^{3}/year. Groundwater use in irrigation leads in places to exploitation of groundwater at rates above groundwater recharge and depletion of groundwater reservoirs.

== Economical significance ==
The irrigated area occupies worldwide about 16% of the total agricultural area, but the crop yield is roughly 40% of the total yield. Hence, the productivity of irrigated land is 3.6 times that of unirrigated land. The monetary value of the yield of irrigated crops is some 6.6 times that of unirrigated crops. In irrigated land one grows crops with higher market values.
