= Apia (disambiguation) =

Apia is the capital of Samoa.

Apia or APIA may also refer to:

== Places ==
- Apía, Risaralda, a town in Colombia
- Apia, city in Greek mythology which was ruled by Apis

== Other uses ==
- Apia Muri, Papua New Guinean basketball player
- APIA Leichhardt FC, an Australian football (soccer) club
- Adaptive participatory integrated approach, a method of managing water irrigation
- Australian Pensioners Insurance Agency, a subsidiary of the Promina Group insurance company
- Apia, a genus of planthopper in the subfamily Menoscinae
