= Water use in alluvial fans =

Water use in alluvial fans refers to irrigation systems using the water resources in alluvial fans, mainly river floods and groundwater recharged by infiltration of rain or river water, to enhance the production of agricultural crops.

== Background ==
Alluvial fans, also called inland deltas, occur at the foot of mountain ranges and mark the presence of river floods. They contain considerable groundwater reservoirs that are replenished each year by infiltration of the water from the river branches into the usually permeable underground, thus creating rich aquifers. The mountainous areas usually receive more rainfall than the plains: they form a watershed and provide a source of water. In (semi)arid regions, therefore, alluvial fans are often used for irrigation of agricultural crops. The fans reveal much greenery in the harsh desert-like environment. Irrigation methods in alluvial fans differ according to the hydrological regime of the river, the shape of the fan, and the natural resources available to maintain human life.

== Examples ==
=== Khuzdar ===
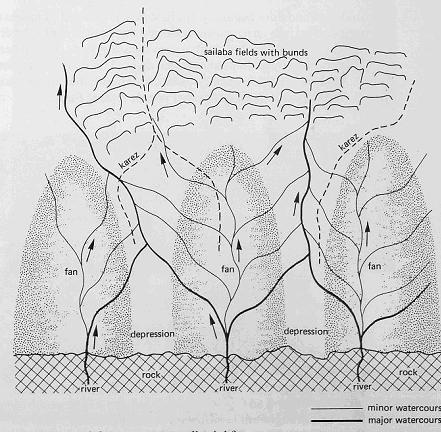
A relatively small and steep alluvial fan near Khuzdar, Baluchistan

The alluvial fans along the river plains near Khuzdar, Baluchistan, are fed by small water catchments in areas of relatively low mountains. The fans are relatively small, steep, and subject to flash floods

Average annual rainfall in Baluchistan varies between 200 and 400 mm, depending on altitude, and the main part occurs in winter (November to March). Of old, in sloping lands, farmers constructed bunds along the contour lines to capture the surface runoff (Fig. K1). This method of water harvesting (locally called khuskaba) provided extra water for agricultural crops planted just up-slope of the bund, where the captured water would infiltrate into the soil and provide extra soil moisture to supplement the scarce rainfall.

In alluvial fans, the spate floods provided and additional source of water. The floods, diverted from the watercourses, were retained behind similar bunds employed in the khuskaba system (Fig. K2). The method of flood interception is locally called sailaba (Rod Kohi elsewhere in Pakistan, generally: spate irrigation). The system is combined with the tapping of groundwater from the aquifer by means of dug underground galleries, called karez or qanat (Fig. K3). The karezes make permanent agriculture possible (Fig. K3).
Although the sailaba-and-qanat systems cover about 20% of the agricultural land, their production is more than 40% of the total.

It is a modern development to sink deep wells in the aquifer of the alluvial fan to exploit the groundwater more effectively than do the traditional karezes. The owners of the wells may be entrepreneurs from elsewhere and the original population runs the risk of losing their karez water when the wells draw the water table down to a deeper depth than that of the karezes so that these fall dry (Fig K4).

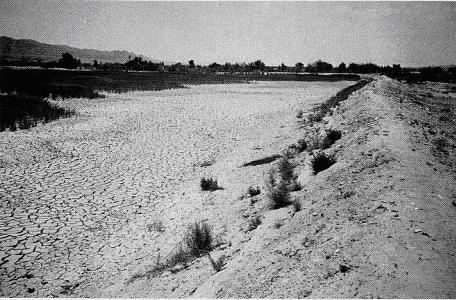
Fig. K1. An earthen bund to retain runoff for crop production

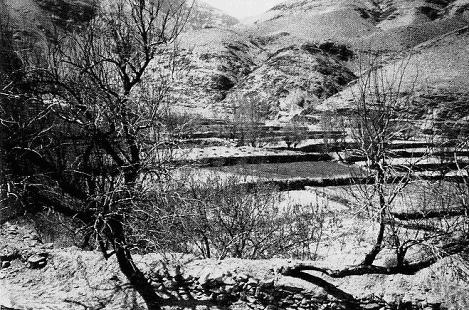
Fig. K3. Permanent irrigation and agriculture based on the karez system in a small valley in Baluchistan

=== Garmsar ===
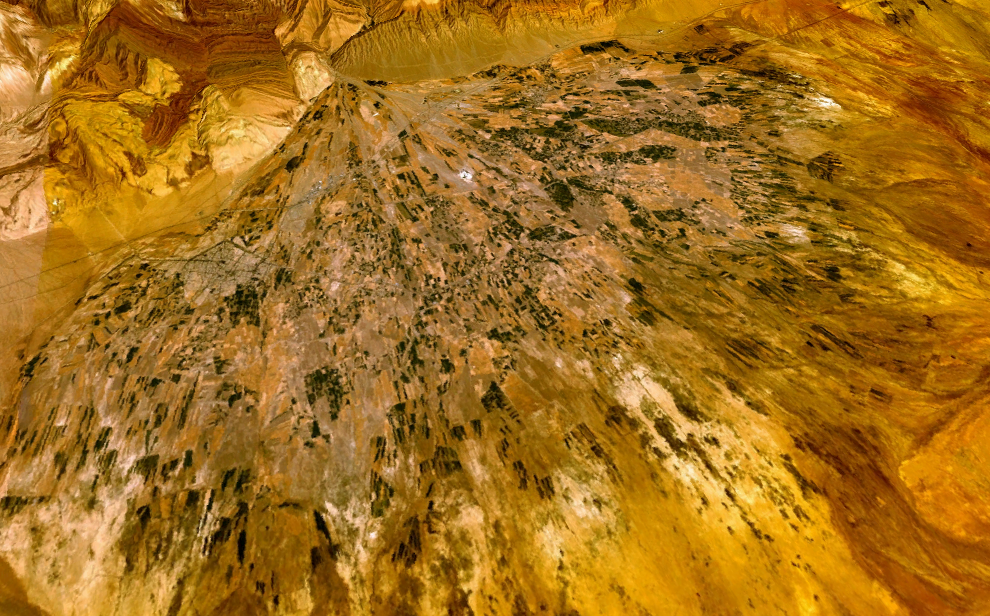
The sizable alluvial fan of Garmsar, near Tehran, Iran. Located at the foot of the Alburz mountains.

The fairly large alluvial fan of Garmsar, east of Tehran, is fed by the Hableh Rud river with an important catchment area in the high Alburz mountain range. The river carries a large amount of water during the rainy season, otherwise the discharge is low.

The irrigation system for the Garmsar alluvial fan is quite well developed (Fig. G1, below), to the extent that lined canals have been made and a large belt-canal crosses the fan through its middle.

Roughly, the cropped area occupies 30% of the land each season, while 70% is left fallow. The winter crops are mainly wheat and barley, while the summer crops are cotton and melons. However, the planting of the new crops is done before harvesting the previous crops. Thus, there is a period of overlap during which 60% of the land is under crops. The fallow land is continuously rotated throughout the years, so that there exists no permanent fallow land, except along the fringes at the base of the fan where soil salinization occurs.

An estimated average annual water balance is shown in Fig. G2 (below). It is seen that the storage of irrigation losses in the aquifer plays an important role. In the dry season the groundwater is used for irrigation by pumping from deep wells. A cross-section of the groundwater situation is shown in Fig. G3 (below).

The water rights are expressed in sang, a measure of continuous flow of about 10 L/s, but in practice it varies from 10 to more than 15 L/s. The water is delivered to about 100 tertiary units (often a village), within which the water is distributed by 12-day rotations amongst the farmers who each are entitled to receive the authorized sangs for a fixed number of hours during each rotation period. The village communities are, at the same time, water-user associations who take care of the water-distribution within the tertiary unit and they maintain the tertiary canals.

At present, the distribution of surface irrigation water to the villages is determined by the Garmsar Water Authority on the basis of the water rights and verbal agreements and communications with the water users in the absence of a written manual. The authority also maintains the irrigation canals and structures. The structures are sometimes re-designed to adjust them to verbally communicated needs. The fair distribution of the irrigation water is not an easy job as the average annual river discharge is quite variable in the range of 5 to 20 m3/s (see graph at the right).

The deep tube-wells are privately owned. The drilling of wells is subject to license. Recently, the licensing has stopped for fear of over-exploitation of the aquifer. It appears that no operational rules are applied to the wells.

In the fringe lands, the water table is shallow because the discharge capacity of the aquifer diminishes here for two reasons: (1) the hydraulic gradient reduces where the sloping alluvial fan reaches the flat desert area, and (2) the thickness and hydraulic conductivity of the aquifer diminishes. The necessary drainage canals for watertable control at the fringes of the irrigation perimeter are not maintained by the water authority, but by the respective farmers groups. For the irrigation water, these groups depend (1) on occasional river floods too large to be handled by the irrigation system and that flow down to the fringe lands through the natural watercourses, (2) on spillage from the irrigation system, and (3) on deep wells.

To stabilize the agriculture in the fringe lands, which are threatened by soil salinization, a method of strip-cropping (Fig. G4) can be recommended for soil salinity control. This method uses irrigated strips next to permanently un-irrigated strips, whereby the salinization is directed to the un-irrigated strips. This concept is sometimes called sacrificial drainage.

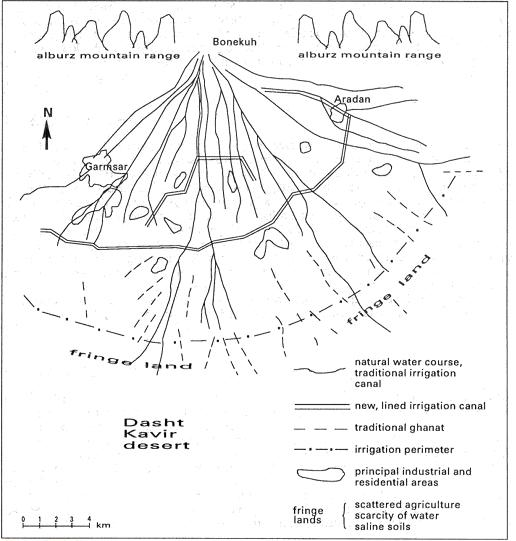
Fig. G1. Map of the Garmsar area showing irrigation systems

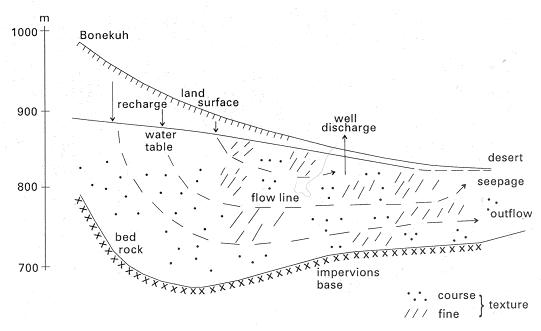
Fig. G3. Cross-section through the aquifer showing the geohydrologic conditions

=== Punata ===
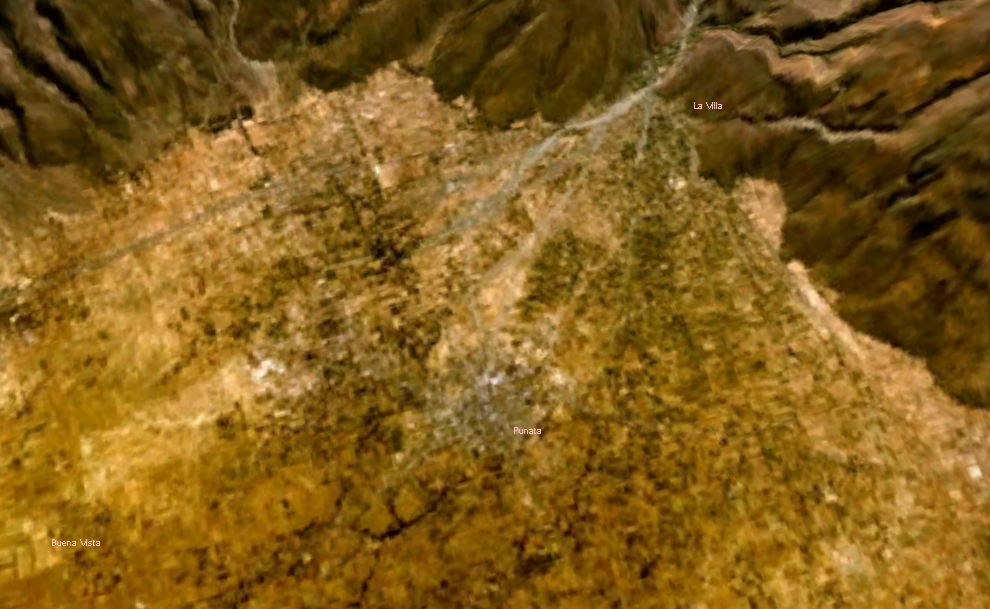
The large alluvial fan of Punata, near Cochabamba, Bolivia. The watershed is located in the Andes mountain range.

The alluvial fan of Punata in the Valle Alto, east of Cochabamba, is fed by the Rio Paracaya river with a higher average discharge than the Hableh Rud, and consequently is fairly flat.

The alluvial fan of Punata is found in the district of Cochabamba, Bolivia. The region of Punata, at the upper end of the Valle (valley) Alto, at about 2800 m altitude, has a summer rainfall of 400 to 450 mm starting in the second half of November end ending in March. Maize is here the most important food crop, followed by potatoes. Alfalfa is the dominant fodder crop, followed by maize straw. (Fig. P1). These crops could, of old, only be planted successfully because of the existence of additional water resources like runoff, floods, river base-flow and groundwater. In the winter months, crop growth is restricted due to the occurrence of night frosts, especially in June and July, and absence of rains.

The total rural population in Punata is estimated at 25 000. There are about 4000 families of which an estimated 3680 are farmer families. The farms are small. The average size is 1.3 ha of which 1 ha is cropped. The modal size of farm is smaller, about 0.7 ha.

The rainfall distribution in Punata is characterized by a wet season from December to March, a dry season from May to October, and transition months in April and November. The average yearly total is 428 mm (1966 to 1983, San Benito). The rainfall with a probability of exceedance of 75% (R75) on a year basis is 360 mm. Rainfall is not reliable: in the period from 1966 to 1983, the yearly total varied between 246 mm (1982/83) to 591 mm (1968/69).

The river floods during the rainy summer period can be used for irrigation by anyone who wants to. When the river flow recedes, the stream can only be used for rotational irrigation by those who are entitled to take part in it (this is locally called the mita system). By the month of May the river base-flow becomes strongly reduced, and a drought period sets in, lasting into November.

Irrigation is considered desirable to start the cropping season in August/September, so that an early harvest can be obtained. The early harvest has a high market value and reduces peak labor requirements. Further, the irrigation reduces the risk of crop failure and it permits diversification of agricultural produce. Nevertheless, there are some farming communities that have refrained in the past from the extra effort to obtain additional irrigation water and who seemed to be content with purely rain-fed cropping.

At a modest scale, irrigation from deep-wells is also practiced.

In order to satisfy the needs of the majority of the farmers who strongly wish to have additional irrigation water, the irrigation project Punata-Tiraque began to be developed from 1970 onwards. The project entailed the construction of a complicated system of dams and reservoirs up in the Andean mountains (Fig. P2).

The gross area of the Punata projects is estimated at 4600 ha, 90% of which can be used for agriculture or animal husbandry. About 1150 ha of this presently receive irrigation water, either surface water derived from the Laguna Robada or Lluska Kocha dam, or water pumped from the 16 deep wells in the project area (estimated at 350 ha). In addition there are a few hundred hectares that receive occasional water from mita irrigation (wild flooding).

The traditional irrigation method is based on handling large irrigation flows (golpes) per farm at large intervals. The intake structures in the Pucara Mayu river, at the place where it enters the alluvial fan of Punata, would alternately pass water from each of the reservoir systems (Laguna Robada and Lluska Kocha / Muyu Loma) and the natural mita water. The new system has been designed for smaller flows with shorter rotation intervals, but it works continuously for the whole area, so that there is no need anymore to separate the various sources of water. It covers a much larger area than the traditional system and it incorporates the associations of the mita systems (which may have partly the same members), the associations of tube-well systems (which may also have partly the same members) as well as the persons who had no previous water rights.

Hence, the new irrigation system makes it necessary to replace the traditional water rights by a totally new set of rights (and duties). In addition, the farmers will have to get used to new water distribution methods and new field irrigation techniques. Because the new irrigation zones do not correspond to the boundaries of the existing, scattered, Comité’s de Riego (Fig. P3), not only the water management but also the organizational structure will have to be adjusted to the new situation.

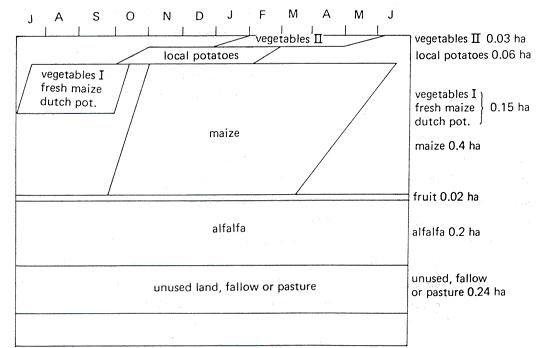
Fig. P1. Typical cropping calendar of an irrigated farm in the Punata area

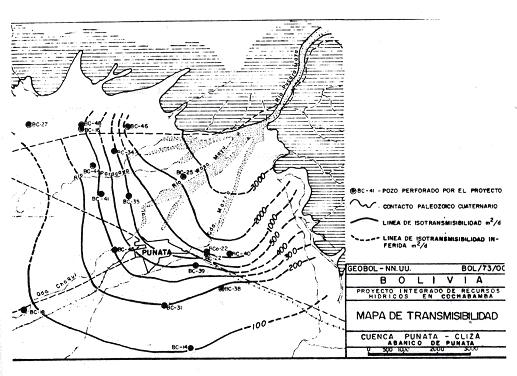
Fig. P4. The permeability and transmissivity of the aquifer diminishes towards the end of the alluvial fan

=== Okavango ===
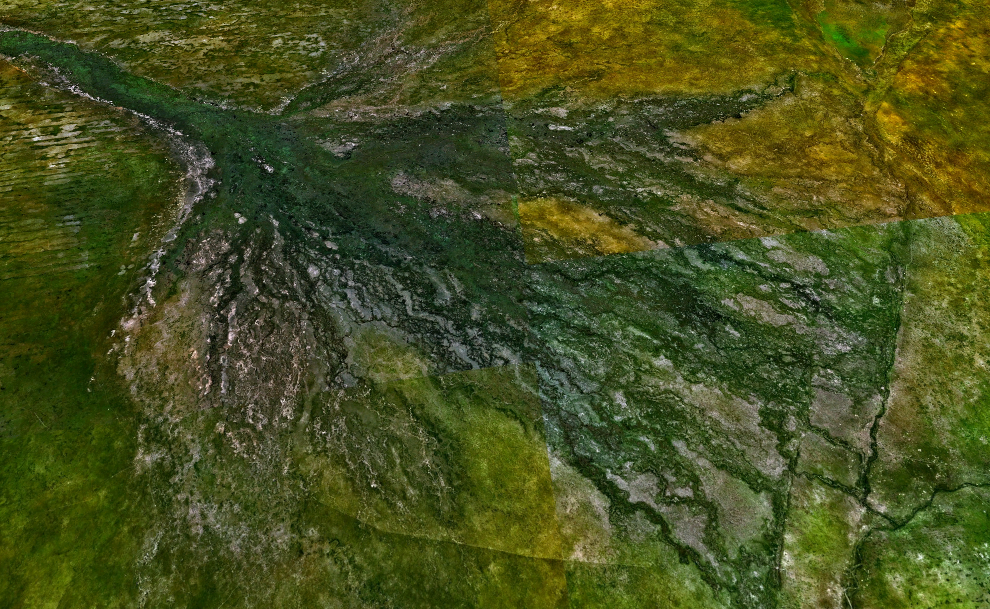
The very extensive and flat Okavango inland delta near Maun, Botswana.

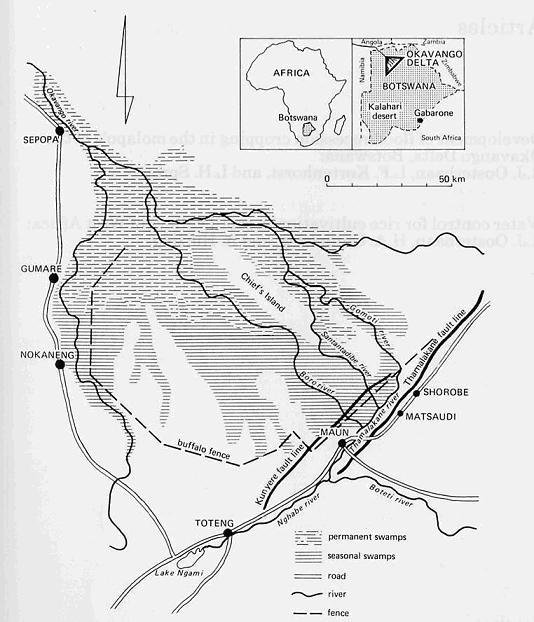
Map of the Okavango Delta

The Okavango inland delta, near Maun, receives an enormous amount of river inflow from Angola. Hence, the fan is so large and flat that it is rather called a delta. It takes six months for the peak inflow at the apex to reach the base of the delta.

==== Features ====
The inland Okavango Delta in northwest Botswana is hand-shaped, with the fingers spread (see map). The Okavango River, which originates in Angola, enters the delta at its apex. On the average, the river carries about 10 000 million m^{3} of water a year into the delta. The flow rate is high in the months of March and April (about 1000 m^{3}/s on the average), but varying from year to year between 500 and 1500 m^{3}/s and low in November (100 to 200 m^{3}/s).

The large volume of water spreading over the delta is almost fully absorbed in permanent and seasonal swamps (the latter are called molapo’s) before is slowly infiltrates or evaporates. There is rich swamp vegetation, which creates an ideal environment for numerous kinds of animals. The rich fauna finds its habitat on and between the thousands of islands between the swamps.

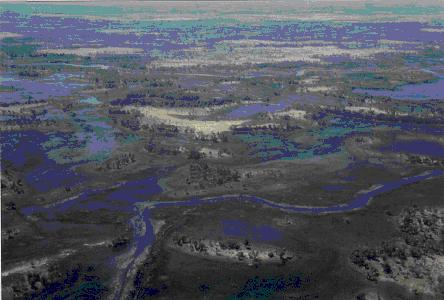
Islands and permanent swamps in the Okavango Delta

The little water that exceeds the retention capacity of the marshy wilderness drains from July to November through the fingers of the giant hand. Hence, it takes almost six months before the peak discharge of the Okavango River manifests itself at the base of the delta. Here, the water meets a barrier: the Thamalakane Fault Line (see map), beyond which the Kalahari sands rise up 10 m. At the foot of the fault, the Thamalakane River collects the water (which is not more than 5% of the total inflow) and carries it almost without gradient to the Boteti River, which flows through a breach in the fault line. Eventually, the remaining waters evaporate in the Makgadikgadi Pans, more than 200 km to the east.

Although the annual rainfall is relatively low (an average of 500 mm, the greater part of which falls from December to March), it contributes a volume of water to the Delta equaling half of the Okavango inflow. The annual rainfall and its yearly distribution are equally erratic as the regime of the river.

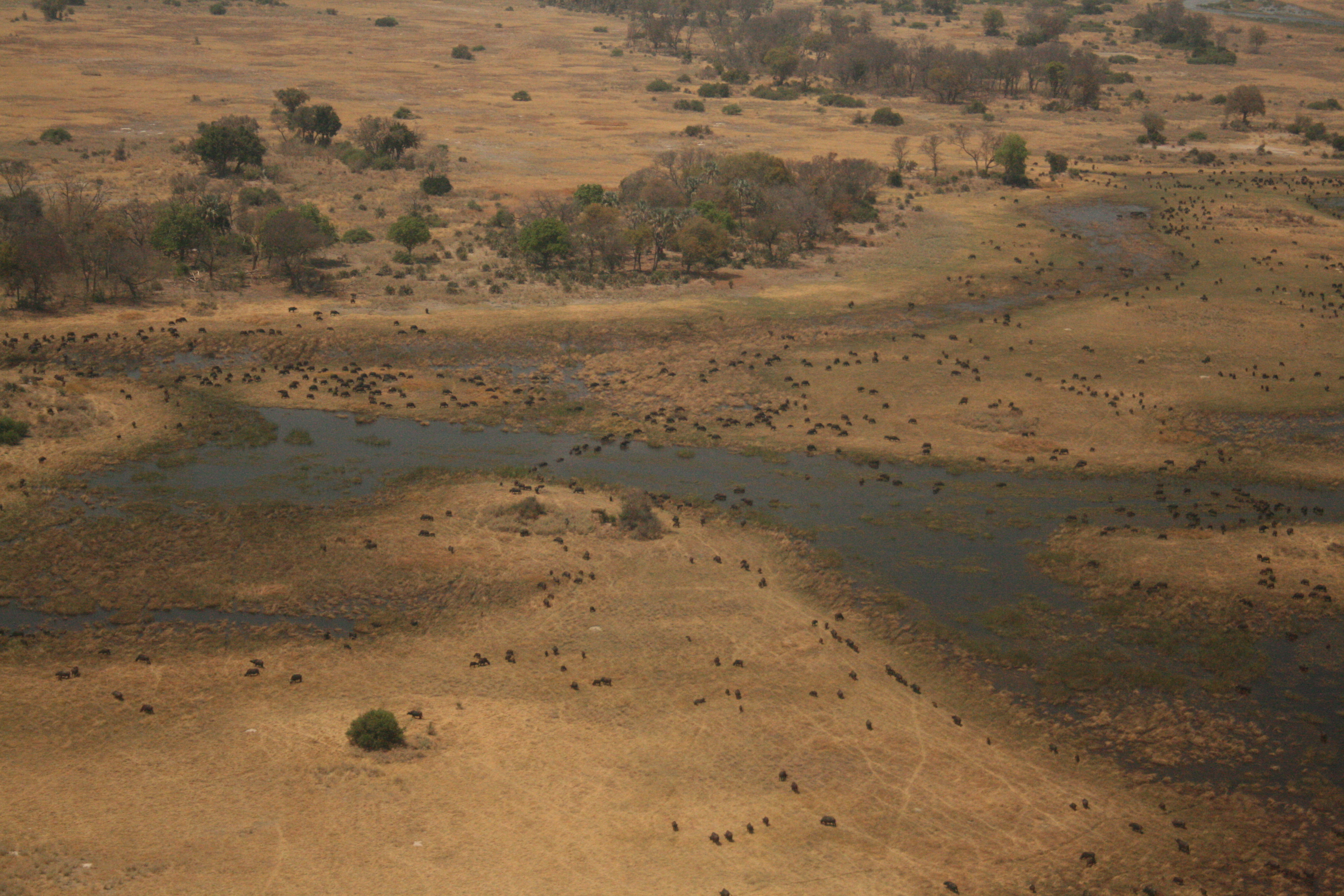
A buffalo herd in the Okavango delta known for its extremely rich wildlife

The Okavango River transports a large amount of sands and other sediments into the delta. Their mass is about 2 million tons a year. Salts also enter the Delta, but they do so in a dissolved form. The salt concentration of the water is some 200 mg/L, which is very low. The total weight of incoming salts is thus about 2 million tons per year.

The sediments and the salts imported by the Okavango River settle in the delta. Together with the vegetation the sediments build up resistances to surface-water flow. As a result, the main watercourses have in the past swayed from thumb to little finger to and fro, as is common in alluvial fans. Tectonic movements have also contributed to this phenomenon. At present the middle finger, from which the Boro River stems, provides the major thoroughfare.

Many of the islands in the delta have a garland of riparian trees along their borders, but in the middle they are bare: symptoms of salt accumulation (see photo of the delta).

The Kalahari Desert cooperates with the Okavango River to form the predominantly sandy soils of the delta. The desert uses the vector wind to deposit its share of fine sand.

The geophysical characteristics of the Okavango Delta have led to a low population density, so that the natural situation has scarcely been disrupted by mankind. Also, the population was more interested in hunting and cattle breeding than in food crop production, so that agricultural developments were limited.

The arable lands in the south-eastern fringes of the delta, that become dry after the floods recede (these are locally known as molapo's), often have a sandy topsoil. In depressions, the topsoil may be thin or missing altogether, exposing a heavy clay soil.

==== Developments ====
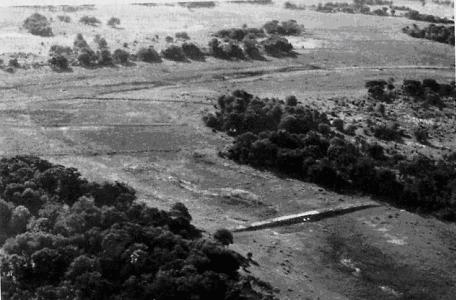
Flood-control bunds in the molapos

In 1978/79, after four years of high and prolonged floods had made molapo farming impossible, a severe drought coincided with an outbreak of foot and mouth disease, leaving the local population in a state of emergency. This resulted in two important undertakings:

- The first took place from 1979 to 1981 when, as part of a drought-relief program (Food for Work), FAO organized labor-intensive works to rehabilitate the flood-control bunds that the local population had built to protect their crops against inundations from rainstorms. Some new bunds were also built.
- The second was the construction of the “Buffalo-fence” (see map), which separates the outer fringes of the delta from its interior to prevent the spread of cattle diseases – especially foot and mouth disease. Completed in 1983, this fence has increased the importance of the molapo’s outside it, and for the following reasons. Especially in the years when rains start late, the new grass flush in the molapo’s after flood-recession presents about the only source of fodder in the region, also for the herds in the wide surroundings of the delta. With the molapo’s inside the fence closed to cattle grazing, the grazing intensity in the molapo’s outside the fence has increased.

The Molapo Development Projects (MDP) became operational in December 1983. The project aimed at increasing crop production in pilot areas by protecting those areas against prolonged high floods by flood-control bunds with entrance gates that could be closed (see photo). When enough floodwater has entered the molapo, the gate can be closed and the water recedes under influence of evaporation and infiltration into the soil and cropping may start when the outside water level is still high. This was a response to the high and prolonged flooding in the years 1974–1978, when molapo cropping was largely impossible. In more recent years, however, inadequate floods appeared to present an equally severe constraint to satisfactory crop production. It was therefore decided to focus also on improved, more stable crop production under fully rain-dependent conditions.

The hydrograph figure shows that crop production has not been possible in 60% of the hitherto recorded years because of the prolonged high floods. The figure also shows how flood-control measures can bring about a timely recession of the water level in the molapo. After the flood has been permitted to enter the bunded molapo, the sluice gates are closed. Recession of the water in the bunded molapo then begins under the influence of evaporation and infiltration, and allows a timely planting of the crop (in October or November). The crops use the residual soil moisture (about 100 mm) till the onset of the rainy season at the end of November or the beginning of December. Thus the growing season is prolonged, the moisture availability is increased, and crop production is enhanced. However, the success of the flood-control measures on the crop performance still depends to a great extent on the amount and distribution of the rainfall.
