= Rod Koh =

Indigenous irrigation system in Pakistan

Rod Koh or Rod Kohi (Persian: راد کوہ) is a form of irrigation system in Pakistan. Rod means channel and Koh means mountain in Persian. The Rod Kohi system based on Kulyat Riwajat (Fromulae and Traditions) which governed the irrigation system ever since the Pashtun tribes moved into Damaan. The British officers moved all these to writing during their Land Settlements in the later part of the nineteenth century. The Bolton Irrigation Notes of 1908 are still considered the Bible of Rod Kohi irrigation. Rod Koh is the main torrent bed which usually remains dry, when there is no flood, whereas Zam means the flow of perennial water coming out of springs.

The flood and perennial water of the Zam is used for irrigation and drinking purpose. Zam water is classified into two categories: Buga Pani (flood water) and Kala Pani (perennial water).

Rod Koh (torrent-spate-irrigation) systems go back at least as early as 330 BC and provided economic basis for some of the early civilisations. Alexander the Great, according to Arrian, sailed down the river Jhelum to its junction with Indus River. His land forces marched in two bodies on either side of the river. They noticed some form of torrent agriculture although in a very poor state in a few locations of the Sulaiman piedmont. Heavy rains in the catchments, which extend up to Balochistan region, Afghanistan, Sulaiman Range, Shirani Hills and Bhattani Range result in water rushing intotorrents in the foothill plains, named as Daman area, where torrent agriculture (Rod Kohi) is practised.

== See also ==
- Zam System
- Spring (hydrosphere)
- Pakistan Agricultural Research Council
- Irrigation in alluvial fans#Khuzdar
- Spate irrigation
