= Zam (irrigation) =

Irrigation system in Pakistan

Zam system (Urdu: زم) is a form of irrigation system in Pakistan. Zam means the flow of perennial water coming out of springs, whereas Rod Koh is the main torrent bed which remains usually dry, when there is no flood.

The flood and perennial water of the Zam is used for irrigation as well as for drinking purpose. Zam water is classified into two categories: Buga pani (flood water) and Kala Pani (perennial water).

Rod Koh (torrent-spate-irrigation) systems go back at least as early as 330 BC and provided economic basis for some of the early civilisations. Alexander the Great, according to Arrian, sailed down the river Jhelum to its junction with Indus River. His land forces marched in two bodies on either side of the river. They noticed some form of torrent agriculture although in a very poor state in a few locations of the Sulaiman piedmont.

Heavy rains in the catchments, which extend up to Balochistan region, Afghanistan, Sulaiman Range, Shirani Hills and Bhattani Range result in water rushing into torrents in the foothill plains, named Daman area, where torrent agriculture (Rod Kohi) is practised.

== See also ==
- Rod Koh
- Spring (hydrosphere)
- Pakistan Agricultural Research Council
- Rod Kohi
