= Abadan Island =

Iranian island

- Location within Iran
- Interactive map of Abadan Island

Geography
- Location: Khuzestan, Iran
- Coordinates: 30°05′N 48°32′E

Administration
- Iran

Demographics
- Population: ~100000 but exact population unknown

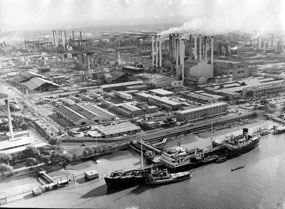
The Abadan Refinery on Abadan Island, operated by the Anglo-Iranian Oil Company.

Abadan Island (Persian: جزیره آبادان) is an island in the delta of the Shatt al-Arab in Iran and is the site of the city of Abadan. The island hosted Anglo-Iranian Oil Company's Abadan Refinery, around which Iranian Prime Minister Mohammad Mossadegh's nationalization movement was centered. Iran and the Ottomans had long had competing claims over Ābādān Island, which was ceded to Iran by Turkey in 1847. It has a population of ~100,000 but its exact population is unknown.

== See also ==
- Tidal irrigation at Abadan island, Iran
- Siege of Abadan
