= Adaptive participatory integrated approach =

Water irrigation development and management method

The adaptive participatory integrated approach (APIA) is a method of developing and managing water irrigation in developing regions. It attempts to balance multiple competing needs for water among various users.

== Overview ==
The prevailing sectoral approach to irrigation management has tended to prevent the optimal use of water for agriculture and fisheries. Adoption of an adaptive, participatory and integrated assessment (APIA) of the impacts of irrigation on fisheries can ensure that poverty is alleviated, and food security and livelihoods are enhanced rather than hurt by irrigation development. It also provides an opportunity to decrease conflicts between fishers and farmers, and to increase overall benefits of irrigation systems at little additional cost.

The approach has been designed in interaction with a multidisciplinary team of researchers, as part the production of the "Guidance Manual for the Management of Impacts of Irrigation Development on Fisheries" (Lorenzen, Smith et al. 2004). The proposed APIA approach was tested through an ex-ante impact assessment in Laos and an ex-post assessment in Sri Lanka.

In Laos, the ex-ante appraisal of the damming of a small river predicted a modest positive impact on production and livelihoods, with creation of a reservoir fishery outweighing degradation of the pre-existing river fishery. The outcome was contingent on continuation of rainfed wet season rice production and traditional farming practices, as adoption of practices involving reduced water storage in paddy fields was likely to reduce fish production considerably. Since maintaining connectivity of paddy fields and perennial water bodies is likewise important, cross-drainage culverts need to be passable to fish and the harvesting at these concentration points should be restricted. The creation of a reservoir would improve access to and convenience of fishing for those within reach, particularly in the dry season, and it would increase opportunities for specialisation in fishing. New income opportunities in irrigated agriculture are likely to reduce the overall level of fishing effort and increase returns, with the greatest benefits to the households most reliant on fishing.

In Sri Lanka, an ex-post evaluation of reservoir construction and the expansion of irrigated command areas revealed a complex picture of both positive and negative impacts at different points in the watershed. Over the catchment as a whole (including upper reaches, floodplain, coastal lagoons, and new and pre-existing reservoirs), the net effect on the value of aggregate production was estimated to have been positive. Sustaining this benefit was contingent on adoption of improved regimes for the management of reservoir water levels and fish stocks. Improvements in the management of the hydrological regime of coastal lagoons would also further raise aggregate production. Although practiced by a minority of rural households, fishing was found to perform a wide range of livelihood functions, including: livelihood of last resort (landless fishers); part of a diversified subsistence or accumulation strategy; or a specialist occupation. Disaggregated analysis of the impacts on the livelihoods of households who practiced fishing showed different effects, depending on where the household fished, and the functions performed by fishing in their livelihood strategy.

In both cases, irrigation development was deemed to have positive net impacts on local fisheries production and to provide livelihood opportunities related to fisheries, in particular to the poor. These gains and opportunities arise from specific local conditions, and can only be realized through the use of appropriate water management, agricultural practices and possibly fisheries regulations.

APIA facilitated the appraisal of gross production and livelihoods impacts, and opportunities for mitigation of negative or enhancement of positive impacts. Testing and systematic evaluation validated the approach and also revealed the following benefits and limitations.

The benefits of APIA compared to a conventional narrow technical assessment have been shown to include the following:

1. The ability to study inland fisheries in a larger context of multiple competing uses for water and alternative livelihood opportunities, with explicit identification of conflicts within a sequential, structured and management oriented process;
2. The aim for addressing the most important issues and solutions to be sought;
3. The emphasis on existing opportunities and the need for workable and cost effective mitigation and enhancement measures, with avoidance where possible of costly modifications to the irrigation infrastructure or other engineering solutions;
4. The strong motivation for stakeholders to seek out complementarities between irrigation and fisheries and to minimize trade-offs, with the potential to determine "win-win" solutions from resolution of conflicts between farmers and fishers.

However, use of APIA approach can be demanding of time, expertise for its implementation and in requirements for its support. In particular adequate awareness and strong institutional support are essential at all relevant levels of governance. Participatory processes can be biased if the representation and influence of competing groups is unbalanced, and there is risk that undue emphasis is given to conflicts that are difficult to resolve. Participation and local knowledge can be of great value, but should not be a substitute for rigorous technical assessment where this is necessary. Finally cumulative and synergistic impacts on fisheries of multiple irrigation schemes and other water resource developments within a river basin need to be further investigated.
