= Tidal irrigation =

Natural irrigation of coastal plains

Tidal irrigation is the natural subsurface irrigation of levee soils in coastal plains using river water influenced by tidal movements. This method is applicable in (semi-)arid regions at the mouth of large rivers estuaries or deltas where there is a significant tidal range. It is achieved by excavating tidal canals from the riverbank into the mainland, allowing river water to flow inland during high tides. During low tides, the canals and soil drain enhance soil aeration. The river discharge must be large enough to guarantee a sufficient flow of fresh water into the sea so that no salt water intrusion occurs in the river mouth. Tidal irrigation efficiently utilizes the periodic movement of tides to naturally push fresh water upstream.

The irrigation is effectuated by digging tidal canals from the river shore into the main land that will guide the river water inland at high tide.

For the irrigation to be effective the soil must have a high infiltration capacity to permit the entry of sufficient water in the soil to cover the evapotranspiration demand of the crop. At low tide, the canals and the soil drain out again, which promotes the aeration of the soil.

== See also ==
- Tidal irrigation at Abadan island, Iran
