= Geography of Zimbabwe =

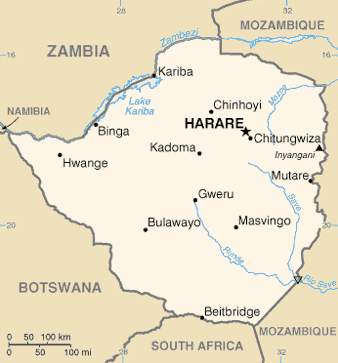
- Continent: Africa
- Region: Southern Africa
- Coordinates: 20°S 30°E
- Area: Ranked 60th
  - Total: 390,757 km^{2} (150,872 sq mi)
  - Land: 99.00%
  - Water: 1.00%
- Coastline: 0 km (0 mi)
- Borders: 3,066 km (Botswana 813 km, Mozambique 1231 km, South Africa 225 km, Zambia 797 km)
- Highest point: Inyangani; 2,592 m (8,504 ft)
- Lowest point: junction of the Runde and Save rivers. 162 m (531 ft)
- Longest river: Zambezi River; 2,650 km
- Largest lake: Lake Kariba; 7,770 km^{2}

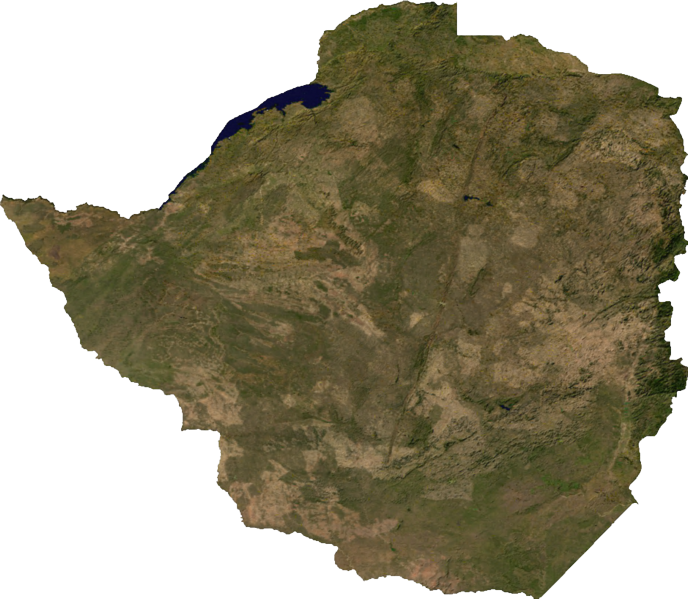
Satellite image of Zimbabwe

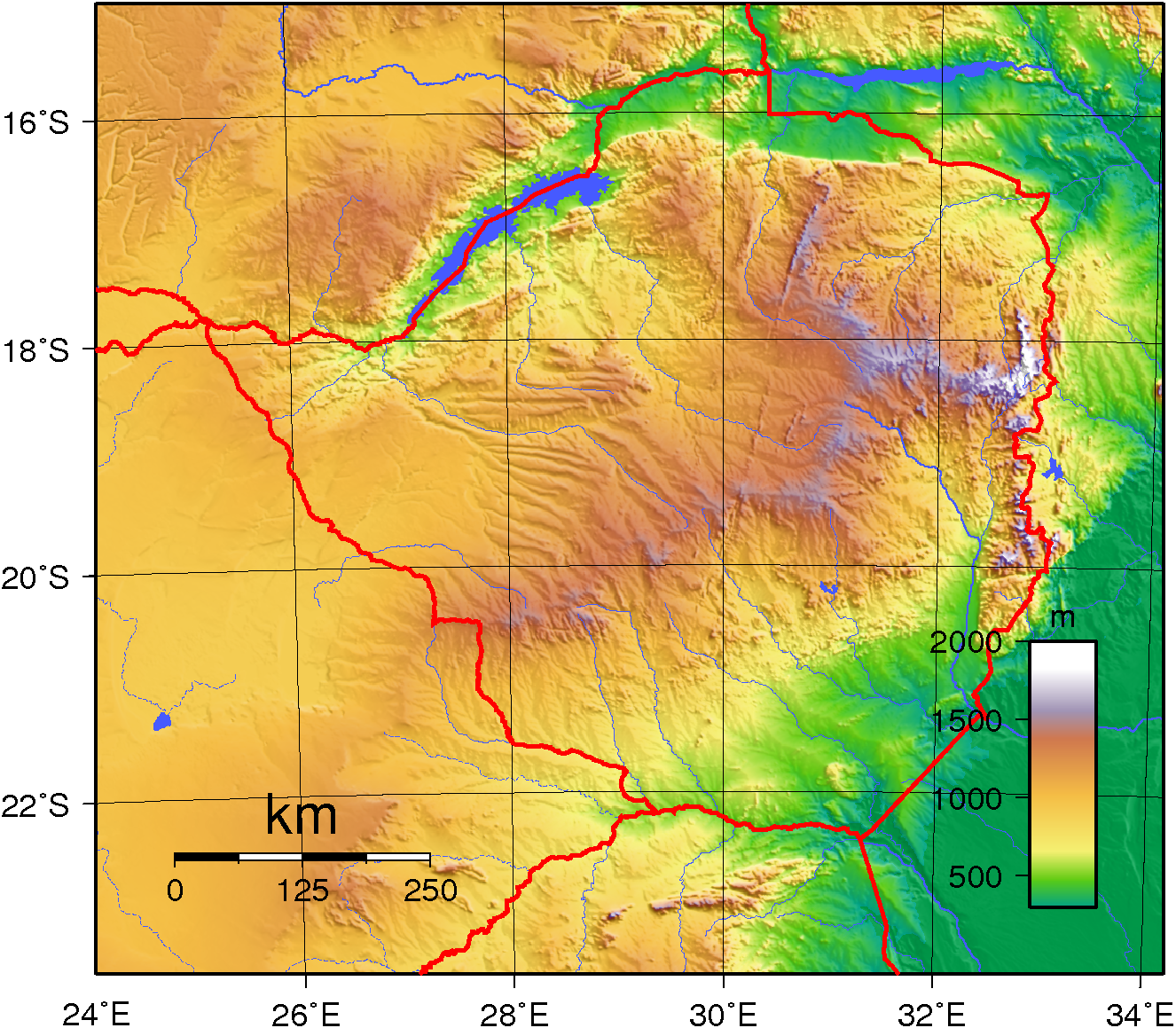
Topography of Zimbabwe

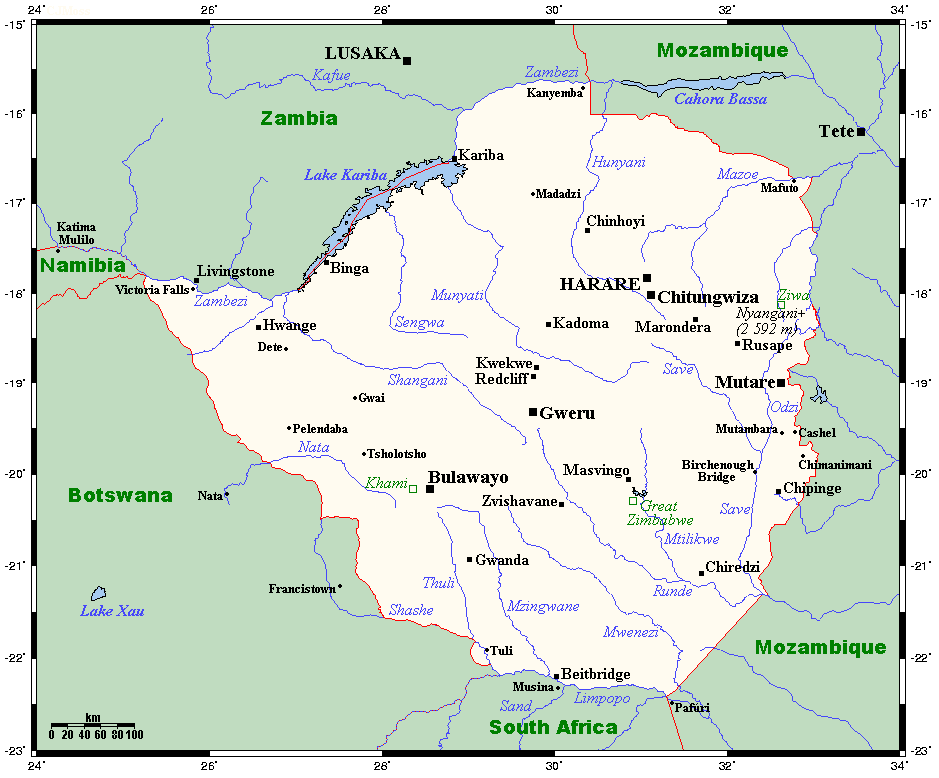
Zimbabwe's cities, main towns, selected villages and archaeological sites, rivers and its highest point

Zimbabwe is a landlocked country in southern Africa lying north of the Tropic of Capricorn. During summer, the whole country experiences warm temperatures as a result of the sun being directly overhead. It straddles an extensive high inland plateau that drops northwards to the Zambezi valley where the border with Zambia is and similarly drops southwards to the Limpopo valley and the border with South Africa.

== Area and boundaries ==
Area
- Total: 390,757 km²
  - country rank in the world: 60th
- Land: 386,850 km²
- Water: 3,910 km²

Area comparative
- Australia comparative: slightly less than half the size of New South Wales
- Canada comparative: slightly smaller than Newfoundland and Labrador
- United Kingdom comparative: approximately 3/5 larger than the United Kingdom
- United States comparative: slightly larger than Montana
- EU comparative: approximately 1/10 larger than Germany
Land boundaries

The country has borders with Botswana (813 km), Mozambique 1,231 km, South Africa (225 km), Zambia 797 km and almost meets Namibia at its westernmost point.

== Climate ==
The climate varies markedly with altitude with the Eastern Highlands at 1,878 metres or 6,161 feet above sea level being much wetter and cooler than lower altitudes. There is a dry season, including a short cool season during the period May to September, when the whole country has very little rain. The rainy season is typically a time of heavy rainfall from November to March. The whole country is influenced by the Intertropical Convergence Zone during January. In years when it is poorly defined there is below-average rainfall and a likelihood of serious drought in the country, as happened in 1983 and 1992. When it is well defined rainfall is average or well above average, as in 1981 and 1986. Zimbabwe’s climate can be categorised into three regions, hot region (lowveld and part of the middleveld), warm region (rest of the middleveld and high veld) and the cool region (Eastern Highlands)

=== Examples ===
Climate data for Harare (1961–1990, extremes 1897–present)
Month	Jan	Feb	Mar	Apr	May	Jun	Jul	Aug	Sep	Oct	Nov	Dec	Year
Record high °C (°F)	33.9 (93.0)	35.0 (95.0)	32.3 (90.1)	32.0 (89.6)	30.0 (86.0)	27.7 (81.9)	28.8 (83.8)	31.0 (87.8)	35.0 (95.0)	36.7 (98.1)	35.3 (95.5)	33.5 (92.3)	36.7 (98.1)
Mean daily maximum °C (°F)	26.2 (79.2)	26.0 (78.8)	26.2 (79.2)	25.6 (78.1)	23.8 (74.8)	21.8 (71.2)	21.6 (70.9)	24.1 (75.4)	28.4 (83.1)	28.8 (83.8)	27.6 (81.7)	26.3 (79.3)	25.5 (77.9)
Daily mean °C (°F)	21.0 (69.8)	20.7 (69.3)	20.3 (68.5)	18.8 (65.8)	16.1 (61.0)	13.7 (56.7)	13.4 (56.1)	15.5 (59.9)	18.6 (65.5)	20.8 (69.4)	21.2 (70.2)	20.9 (69.6)	18.4 (65.1)
Mean daily minimum °C (°F)	15.8 (60.4)	15.7 (60.3)	14.5 (58.1)	12.5 (54.5)	9.3 (48.7)	6.8 (44.2)	6.5 (43.7)	8.5 (47.3)	11.7 (53.1)	14.5 (58.1)	15.5 (59.9)	15.8 (60.4)	12.3 (54.1)
Record low °C (°F)	9.6 (49.3)	8.0 (46.4)	7.5 (45.5)	4.7 (40.5)	2.8 (37.0)	0.1 (32.2)	0.1 (32.2)	1.1 (34.0)	4.1 (39.4)	5.1 (41.2)	6.1 (43.0)	10.0 (50.0)	0.1 (32.2)
Average precipitation mm (inches)	190.8 (7.51)	176.3 (6.94)	99.1 (3.90)	37.2 (1.46)	7.4 (0.29)	1.8 (0.07)	2.3 (0.09)	2.9 (0.11)	6.5 (0.26)	40.4 (1.59)	93.2 (3.67)	182.7 (7.19)	840.6 (33.09)
Average precipitation days	17	14	10	5	2	1	0	1	1	5	10	16	82
Average relative humidity (%)	76	77	72	67	62	60	55	50	45	48	63	73	62
Mean monthly sunshine hours	217.0	190.4	232.5	249.0	269.7	264.0	279.0	300.7	294.0	285.2	231.0	198.4	3,010.9
Mean daily sunshine hours	7.0	6.8	7.5	8.3	8.7	8.8	9.0	9.7	9.8	9.2	7.7	6.4	8.2
Source 1: World Meteorological Organization, NOAA (sun and mean temperature, 1961–1990),
Source 2: Deutscher Wetterdienst (humidity, 1954–1975), Meteo Climat (record highs and lows)

Climate data for Bulawayo (1961-1990 normals)
Month	Jan	Feb	Mar	Apr	May	Jun	Jul	Aug	Sep	Oct	Nov	Dec	Year
Record high °C (°F)	36.7 (98.1)	34.4 (93.9)	35.6 (96.1)	33.0 (91.4)	30.6 (87.1)	28.3 (82.9)	28.3 (82.9)	32.2 (90.0)	35.0 (95.0)	36.7 (98.1)	37.2 (99.0)	35.2 (95.4)	37.2 (99.0)
Mean daily maximum °C (°F)	27.7 (81.9)	27.2 (81.0)	27.1 (80.8)	25.9 (78.6)	24.1 (75.4)	21.6 (70.9)	21.5 (70.7)	24.4 (75.9)	27.9 (82.2)	29.4 (84.9)	28.7 (83.7)	27.7 (81.9)	26.1 (79.0)
Daily mean °C (°F)	21.8 (71.2)	21.2 (70.2)	20.6 (69.1)	18.7 (65.7)	16.0 (60.8)	13.7 (56.7)	13.8 (56.8)	16.4 (61.5)	19.9 (67.8)	21.6 (70.9)	21.7 (71.1)	21.4 (70.5)	18.9 (66.0)
Mean daily minimum °C (°F)	16.5 (61.7)	16.2 (61.2)	15.3 (59.5)	13.0 (55.4)	9.9 (49.8)	7.4 (45.3)	7.2 (45.0)	9.1 (48.4)	12.4 (54.3)	15.0 (59.0)	16.0 (60.8)	16.3 (61.3)	12.9 (55.2)
Record low °C (°F)	10.0 (50.0)	9.4 (48.9)	8.4 (47.1)	3.5 (38.3)	0.0 (32.0)	−3.9 (25.0)	0.0 (32.0)	0.0 (32.0)	1.4 (34.5)	6.9 (44.4)	7.2 (45.0)	8.9 (48.0)	−3.9 (25.0)
Average rainfall mm (inches)	117.8 (4.64)	104.6 (4.12)	51.4 (2.02)	33.3 (1.31)	7.0 (0.28)	2.2 (0.09)	1.0 (0.04)	1.4 (0.06)	7.0 (0.28)	38.4 (1.51)	91.1 (3.59)	120.3 (4.74)	575.5 (22.66)
Average rainy days	10	8	5	3	1	1	0	0	1	4	8	10	51
Average relative humidity (%)	69	71	70	62	56	54	48	43	41	43	55	63	56
Mean monthly sunshine hours	244.9	212.8	251.1	252.0	279.0	267.0	288.3	300.7	288.0	272.8	237.0	226.3	3,119.9
Mean daily sunshine hours	7.9	7.6	8.1	8.4	9.0	8.9	9.3	9.7	9.6	8.8	7.9	7.3	8.5
Source 1: World Meteorological Organization NOAA (sun and mean temperature, 1961–1990)
Source 2: Deutscher Wetterdienst (extremes and humidity)

Climate data for Mutare
Month	Jan	Feb	Mar	Apr	May	Jun	Jul	Aug	Sep	Oct	Nov	Dec	Year
Mean daily maximum °C (°F)	27.6 (81.7)	26.8 (80.2)	26.3 (79.3)	25.2 (77.4)	23.7 (74.7)	21.4 (70.5)	21.2 (70.2)	23.2 (73.8)	26.1 (79.0)	27.0 (80.6)	27.5 (81.5)	27.1 (80.8)	25.3 (77.5)
Mean daily minimum °C (°F)	17.5 (63.5)	16.3 (61.3)	15.6 (60.1)	13.9 (57.0)	10.6 (51.1)	8.0 (46.4)	7.6 (45.7)	9.3 (48.7)	12.2 (54.0)	14.6 (58.3)	16.1 (61.0)	16.9 (62.4)	13.2 (55.8)
Average rainfall mm (inches)	153.5 (6.04)	164.5 (6.48)	88.4 (3.48)	31.8 (1.25)	12.4 (0.49)	8.9 (0.35)	5.8 (0.23)	6.0 (0.24)	20.2 (0.80)	45.9 (1.81)	86.4 (3.40)	167.0 (6.57)	790.8 (31.13)
Average rainy days	13	11	10	4	3	2	2	2	2	5	8	12	74
Source: World Meteorological Organization

Climate data for Hwange (1961–1990)
Month	Jan	Feb	Mar	Apr	May	Jun	Jul	Aug	Sep	Oct	Nov	Dec	Year
Mean daily maximum °C (°F)	29.2 (84.6)	28.9 (84.0)	28.8 (83.8)	27.9 (82.2)	26.2 (79.2)	24.0 (75.2)	24.1 (75.4)	26.9 (80.4)	30.9 (87.6)	32.1 (89.8)	31.7 (89.1)	29.7 (85.5)	28.4 (83.1)
Mean daily minimum °C (°F)	18.1 (64.6)	17.7 (63.9)	16.8 (62.2)	13.4 (56.1)	8.7 (47.7)	4.9 (40.8)	4.6 (40.3)	7.2 (45.0)	12.1 (53.8)	16.0 (60.8)	17.5 (63.5)	18.0 (64.4)	12.9 (55.2)
Average rainfall mm (inches)	145.1 (5.71)	128.9 (5.07)	57.1 (2.25)	20.3 (0.80)	2.6 (0.10)	0.1 (0.00)	0.0 (0.0)	0.6 (0.02)	1.6 (0.06)	21.4 (0.84)	55.8 (2.20)	126.5 (4.98)	560.0 (22.05)
Average rainy days	12	10	7	3	1	0	0	0	1	3	7	12	56
Source: World Meteorological Organization

Climate data for Gweru (1961–1990)
Month	Jan	Feb	Mar	Apr	May	Jun	Jul	Aug	Sep	Oct	Nov	Dec	Year
Mean daily maximum °C (°F)	26.3 (79.3)	25.8 (78.4)	25.8 (78.4)	24.7 (76.5)	22.9 (73.2)	20.6 (69.1)	20.5 (68.9)	23.3 (73.9)	26.8 (80.2)	28.3 (82.9)	27.4 (81.3)	26.3 (79.3)	24.9 (76.8)
Mean daily minimum °C (°F)	15.3 (59.5)	15.1 (59.2)	13.8 (56.8)	11.3 (52.3)	7.6 (45.7)	4.9 (40.8)	4.5 (40.1)	6.5 (43.7)	10.0 (50.0)	13.1 (55.6)	14.5 (58.1)	15.1 (59.2)	11.0 (51.8)
Average rainfall mm (inches)	139.1 (5.48)	124.8 (4.91)	55.9 (2.20)	29.0 (1.14)	7.7 (0.30)	1.9 (0.07)	1.0 (0.04)	1.9 (0.07)	9.3 (0.37)	35.1 (1.38)	96.2 (3.79)	159.4 (6.28)	661.3 (26.04)
Average rainy days	12	10	7	3	1	1	0	0	1	4	9	12	60
Source: World Meteorological Organization

== Terrain ==
Much of the country is on a plateau with a higher central plateau (high veld) forming a watershed between the Zambezi and Limpopo river systems. The flattish watershed region is part of an ancient etchplain called the African Surface covers large swathes of the continent. While the African Surface occupy the higher ground, spurs and small interfluves a younger "post-African" surface occupy lower positions with occasional rock domes, koppies and tors protruding rolling or plain landscape. The Limpopo and the lower Zambezi valleys are broad and relatively flat plains. The eastern end of the watershed terminates in a north-south mountain spine, called the Eastern Highlands. The northeast-southwest oriented central uplands have been uplifted in geologically recent times (Late Pliocene or Pleistocene) deviating the watercourse of upper Zambezi River that used to flow into the Limpopo River to the east to its current outlet at the Mozambique Channel. The northeast-southwest upland and watershed follows the axis of an epeirogenic flexure.

Elevation extremes:
lowest point: junction of the Runde and Save rivers 162 m
highest point: Mount Nyangani 2,592 m

Natural resources: coal, chromium ore, asbestos, gold, nickel, copper, iron ore, vanadium, lithium, tin, diamond, platinum group metals

Land use:
arable land: 10.49%
permanent crops: 0.31%
other: 89.20% (2011)

Irrigated land: 1,735 km² (2003)

Total renewable water resources: 20 km^{3} (2011)

Natural hazards: droughts; floods and severe storms are rare

Environment — current issues: deforestation; soil erosion; land degradation; air and water pollution; the black rhinoceros herd – once the largest concentration of the species in the world – has been significantly reduced by poaching; poor mining practices have led to toxic waste and heavy metal pollution

Environment — international agreements: ↵party to: Biodiversity, Climate Change, Desertification, Endangered Species, Law of the Sea, Ozone Layer Protection signed, but not ratified: none of the selected agreements.

Hydrology: ↵The country is divided into six drainage basins. The largest are the Zambezi and the Limpopo. Western parts of Matabeleland connect to the Okavango inland drainage basin through the Nata River. Most of southern Mashonaland and adjacent parts of Masvingo drain through the Save river into the Indian Ocean. Two smaller drainage basins cover parts of Manicaland, and drain into the Indian Ocean through Mozambique. These are the Pungwe river to the north and the Buzi river to the south. Sediment transport has been studied for rivers in Zimbabwe using the HBV hydrology transport model.

Main land use type:

1. Above 1,050 millimetres or 41 inches/annum with some precipitation in all months of the year Afforestation, fruit, tea, coffee and intensive livestock production.
2. 750 to 1,000 millimetres (30 to 40 in)/annum seasonally confined with well-defined dry season Large scale intensive crop and livestock production.
3. 650 to 800 millimetres (26 to 31 in)/annum with regular mid-season dry spells Livestock production with fodder crops. Marginal production of maize, tobacco and cotton.
4. 450 to 650 millimetres (18 to 26 in)/annum with periodic seasonal drought and severe rainy season dry spells. Livestock production and drought resistant crops.
5. Too low and erratic for even drought resistant fodder and grain crops. Extensive livestock and/or game ranching.

== Extreme points ==
This is a list of the extreme points of Zimbabwe, the points that are farther north, south, east or west than any other location.

- Northernmost point — unnamed location on the border with Zambia in the Zambezi river immediately north of the town of Kanyemba, Mashonaland West province
- Easternmost point — unnamed location on the border with Mozambique immediately west of the Mozambican town of Vera, Manicaland province
- Southernmost point — the tripoint with South Africa and Mozambique, Masvingo Province
- Westernmost point — the tripoint with Botswana and Zambia, Matabeleland North province, about 150 meters from the easternmost point of Namibia at what is almost a quadripoint

== Weather hazards in Zimbabwe ==
Weather hazards are conditions which are unfavorable to people and their activities that result from weather phenomena, and include any naturally occurring weather condition that has the potential to cause harm to people. Most of these cannot be prevented however their effects can be mitigated. Zimbabwe is affected by various weather hazards including droughts, floods, heat wave, lightning and wildfires over the past century. These weather hazards has affected a lot of people in Zimbabwe resulting to a number of deaths and other challenges. Sixteen districts across six provinces Manicaland, Mashonaland Central, Mashonaland West, Mashonaland East, Midlands and Matabeleland North in Zimbabwe have been affected by heavy rains and floods since the 2021/2022 rainy season began in October 2021. Tropical Storm Ana brought heavy rains to Zimbabwe in late-January, causing floods and damage, affecting 845 houses and 51 schools.

=== Types of weather hazards that have affected Zimbabwe ===
The main weather hazards that have affected Zimbabwe include:

- Drought
- Floods
- Lightning
- Frost
- Heat wave
- Wildfires

=== Drought ===
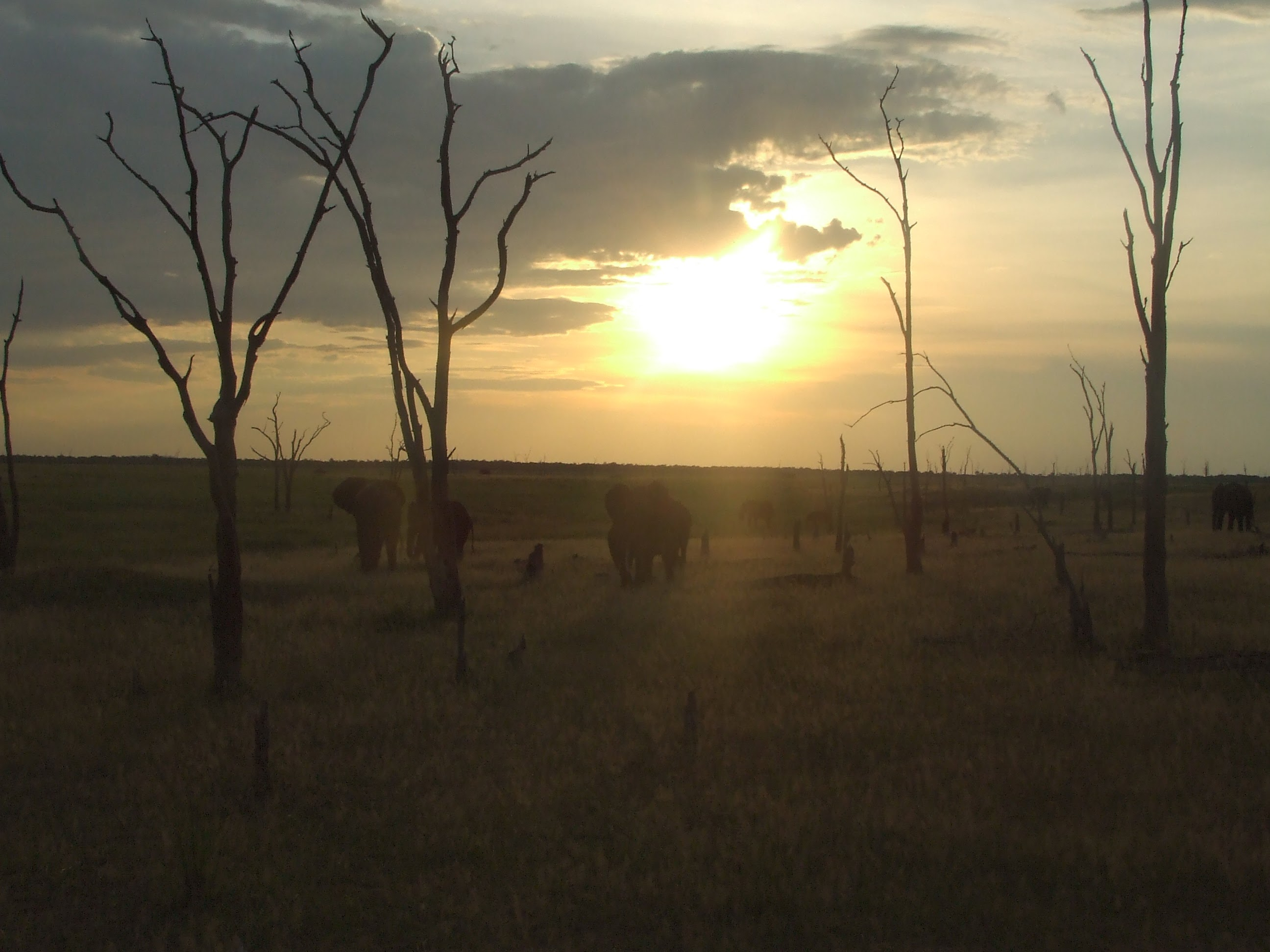
Climate and Weather near Kariba in Zimbabwe

Drought has to do with a period of abnormally dry weather which is caused little or no rainfall producing a lack of water.

==== Effects of Drought in Zimbabwe ====
In Zimbabwe droughts carry many effects which include factors leading to economic struggles. Inflation rates go up as farmers undergo crop failure and loss of livestock a well as often wildfires. Due to drought the country is faced with serious water shortages as well as outrageous power cuts.

==== Mitigation ====
To limit the effects of drought the country can make use of cloud seeding, stocking of harvest in GMBs during fruitful years and/or practice irrigation.

Building and servicing dams and rivers that are no longer serving their purpose

=== Floods ===
Flooding refer to an abnormal overflow of a large amount of water beyond its normal limits, especially over what is normally Drylands. These are caused by abnormal rainfall and cyclones.

==== Effects of Floods in Zimbabwe ====
The primary effects of flooding include loss of life and damage to buildings and other structures, including bridges, sewerage systems, roadways, and canals. Floods also frequently damage power transmission and sometimes power generation. As a common after-effect of severe flooding, Zimbabwe has also faced economic hardship due to a temporary decline in tourism, rebuilding costs, or food shortages leading to price increases.

==== Mitigation ====
In January 2022 the country's Department of Civil Protection (DCP) set up 394 evacuation centers in Manicaland province to deal with the impact of Cyclone Ana. This was the government's way of limiting the effects of the floods as it was noted that parts of Mutasa and Chimanimani districts were already receiving strong winds and heavy rains associated with the storm. Another way of mitigating the effects of flooding is relocating people before during and after the floods and ensuring that everyone is at safe place when the cyclone hits the area. This is seen in Zimbabwe where the authorities announced that school children from the most vulnerable areas should not go to school but stay home on the days when cyclone Freddy was expected.

==== Effects of lightning in Zimbabwe ====
Lightning is very harmful; it affects both livelihood as well as the infrastructure. A number of people have been hospitalized and some died due to the effects of lightning this is evidenced when lightning bolt struck and wounded 13 male prisoners while they were having lunch at a jail in northwestern Zimbabwe, and in some areas especially game parks a number of animals have died due to lightning. Lightning also has a record of destroying infrastructure, one family in Beitbridge were left stranded as they lost their home to lightning.

==== Mitigation ====
To prevent and reduce the effects of lightning people are advised to avoid open spaces as well as standing under tall trees and to ensure that buildings have lightning protection.

=== Frost ===
Frost occurs when weather patterns changes causing a deposit of small white ice crystals formed on the ground, windows, cars or other open surfaces when the temperature falls below freezing

==== Effects of Frost in Zimbabwe ====
In 2021 Zimbabwe Farmers Union director Paul Zakariya confirmed to herald that a number of farmers are affected by frost as he said they had received numerous reports of ground frost that had affected several crops across the Zimbabwean growers hit by frosty conditions. In some areas like Matobo wear frost often hits people are always affected by frostbites as they would have been affected by the cold.

==== Mitigation ====
Agriculture expert Mr Ivan Craig encouraged farmers to reduce damage of crop to frost by growing crops that are less susceptible to frost in winter these are onion, peas, garlic, cauliflower, broccoli, carrot and winter cabbage among others. People who are in areas always affected by frost are encouraged to keep warm all the time to avoid developing frostbites. Farmers could also construct a wall of thatch grass around the garden or burn cow dung around the field as this will help trap frost when it comes.

== See also ==
- Guruuswa
