= Hydrological transport model =

Type of mathematical model

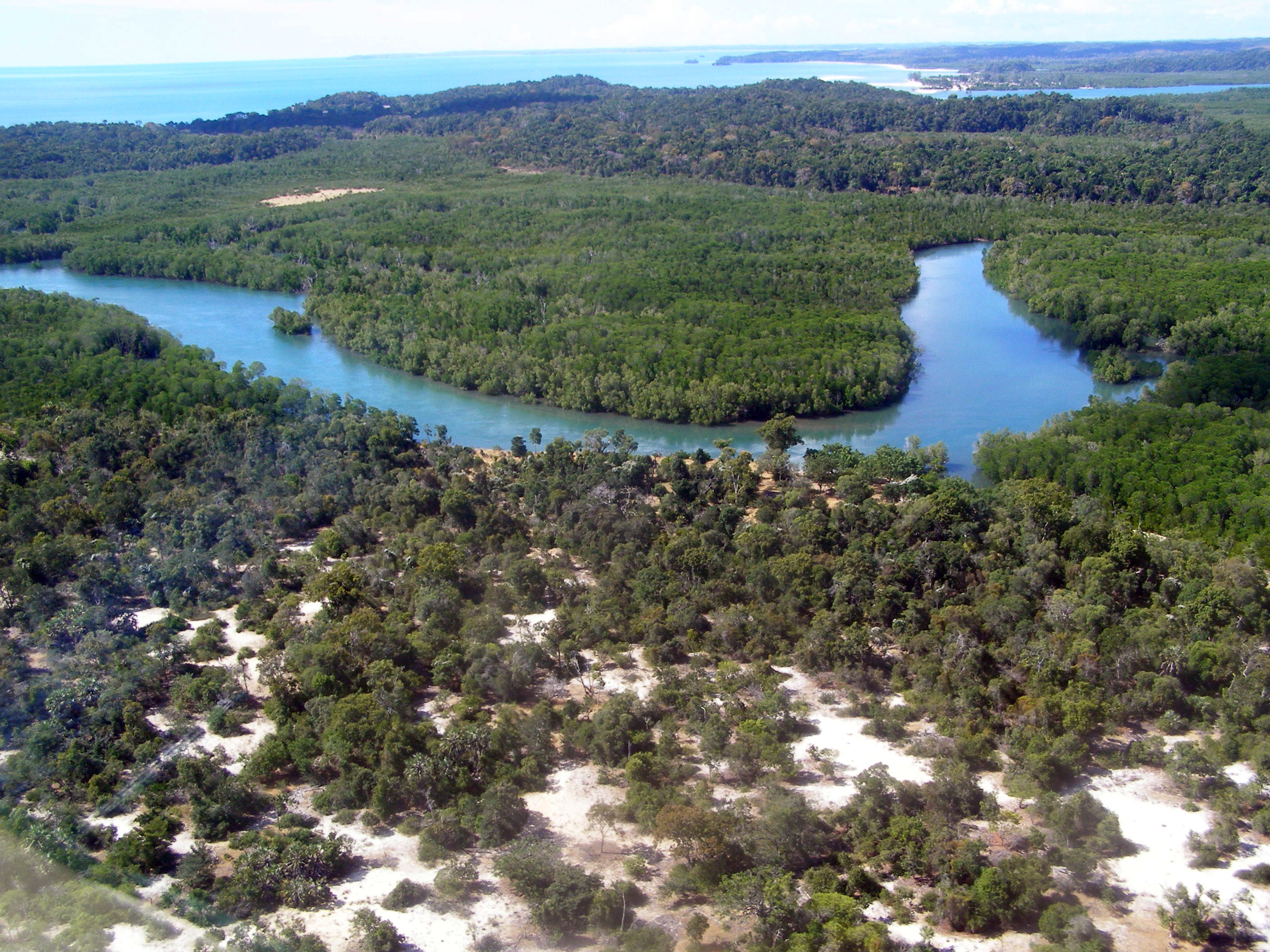
River in Madagascar relatively free of sediment load

An hydrological transport model is a mathematical model used to simulate the flow of rivers, streams, groundwater movement or drainage front displacement, and calculate water quality parameters. These models generally came into use in the 1960s and 1970s when demand for numerical forecasting of water quality and drainage was driven by environmental legislation, and at a similar time widespread access to significant computer power became available. Much of the original model development took place in the United States and United Kingdom, but today these models are refined and used worldwide.

There are dozens of different transport models that can be generally grouped by pollutants addressed, complexity of pollutant sources, whether the model is steady state or dynamic, and time period modeled. Another important designation is whether the model is distributed (i.e. capable of predicting multiple points within a river) or lumped. In a basic model, for example, only one pollutant might be addressed from a simple point discharge into the receiving waters. In the most complex of models, various line source inputs from surface runoff might be added to multiple point sources, treating a variety of chemicals plus sediment in a dynamic environment including vertical river stratification and interactions of pollutants with in-stream biota. In addition watershed groundwater may also be included. The model is termed "physically based" if its parameters can be measured in the field.

Often models have separate modules to address individual steps in the simulation process. The most common module is a subroutine for calculation of surface runoff, allowing variation in land use type, topography, soil type, vegetative cover, precipitation and land management practice (such as the application rate of a fertilizer). The concept of hydrological modeling can be extended to other environments such as the oceans, but most commonly (and in this article) the subject of a river watershed is generally implied.

== History ==
In 1850, T. J. Mulvany was probably the first investigator to use mathematical modeling in a stream hydrology context, although there was no chemistry involved. By 1892 M.E. Imbeau had conceived an event model to relate runoff to peak rainfall, again still with no chemistry. Robert E. Horton's seminal work on surface runoff along with his coupling of quantitative treatment of erosion laid the groundwork for modern chemical transport hydrology.

== Types ==
=== Physically based models ===
Physically based models (sometimes known as deterministic, comprehensive or process-based models) try to represent the physical processes observed in the real world. Typically, such models contain representations of surface runoff, subsurface flow, evapotranspiration, and channel flow, but they can be far more complicated. "Large scale simulation experiments were begun by the U.S. Army Corps of Engineers in 1953 for reservoir management on the main stem of the Missouri River". This, and other early work that dealt with the River Nile and the Columbia River are discussed, in a wider context, in a book published by the Harvard Water Resources Seminar, that contains the sentence just quoted. Another early model that integrated many submodels for basin chemical hydrology was the Stanford Watershed Model (SWM). The SWMM (Storm Water Management Model), the HSPF (Hydrological Simulation Program – FORTRAN) and other modern American derivatives are successors to this early work.

In Europe a favoured comprehensive model is the Système Hydrologique Européen (SHE), which has been succeeded by MIKE SHE and SHETRAN. MIKE SHE is a watershed-scale physically based, spatially distributed model for water flow and sediment transport. Flow and transport processes are represented by either finite difference representations of partial differential equations or by derived empirical equations. The following principal submodels are involved:

- Evapotranspiration: Penman-Monteith formalism
- Erosion: Detachment equations for raindrop and overland flow
- Overland and Channel Flow: Saint-Venant equations of continuity and momentum
- Overland Flow Sediment Transport: 2D total sediment load conservation equation
- Unsaturated Flow: Richards equation
- Saturated Flow: Darcy's law and the mass conservation of 2D laminar flow
- Channel Sediment Transport 1D mass conservation equation.

This model can analyze effects of land use and climate changes upon in-stream water quality, with consideration of groundwater interactions.

Worldwide a number of basin models have been developed, among them RORB (Australia), Xinanjiang (China), Tank model (Japan), ARNO (Italy), TOPMODEL (Europe), UBC (Canada) and HBV (Scandinavia), MOHID Land (Portugal). However, not all of these models have a chemistry component. Generally speaking, SWM, SHE and TOPMODEL have the most comprehensive stream chemistry treatment and have evolved to accommodate the latest data sources including remote sensing and geographic information system data.

In the United States, the Corps of Engineers, Engineer Research and Development Center in conjunction with a researchers at a number of universities have developed the Gridded Surface/Subsurface Hydrologic Analysis GSSHA model. GSSHA is widely used in the U.S. for research and analysis by U.S. Army Corps of Engineers districts and larger consulting companies to compute flow, water levels, distributed erosion, and sediment delivery in complex engineering designs. A distributed nutrient and contaminant fate and transport component is undergoing testing. GSSHA input/output processing and interface with GIS is facilitated by the Watershed Modeling System (WMS).

Another model used in the United States and worldwide is Vflo, a physics-based distributed hydrologic model developed by Vieux & Associates, Inc. Vflo employs radar rainfall and GIS data to compute spatially distributed overland flow and channel flow. Evapotranspiration, inundation, infiltration, and snowmelt modeling capabilities are included. Applications include civil infrastructure operations and maintenance, stormwater prediction and emergency management, soil moisture monitoring, land use planning, water quality monitoring, and others.

=== Stochastic models ===
These models based on data are black box systems, using mathematical and statistical concepts to link a certain input (for instance rainfall) to the model output (for instance runoff). Commonly used techniques are regression, transfer functions, neural networks and system identification. These models are known as stochastic hydrology models. Data based models have been used within hydrology to simulate the rainfall-runoff relationship, represent the impacts of antecedent moisture and perform real-time control on systems.

== Model components ==
=== Surface runoff modelling ===
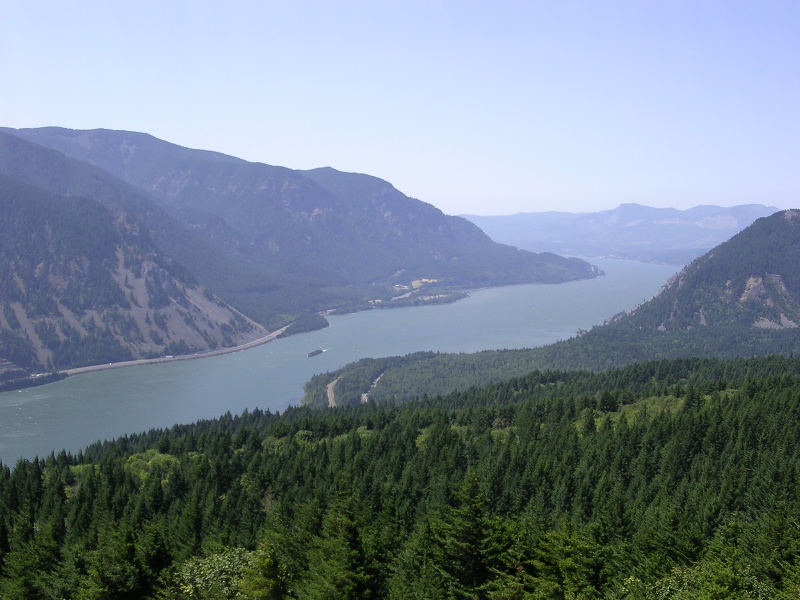
Columbia River, which has surface runoff from agriculture and logging

A key component of a hydrological transport model is the surface runoff element, which allows assessment of sediment, fertilizer, pesticide and other chemical contaminants. Building on the work of Horton, the unit hydrograph theory was developed by Dooge in 1959. It required the presence of the National Environmental Policy Act and kindred other national legislation to provide the impetus to integrate water chemistry to hydrology model protocols. In the early 1970s the U.S. Environmental Protection Agency (EPA) began sponsoring a series of water quality models in response to the Clean Water Act. An example of these efforts was developed at the Southeast Water Laboratory, one of the first attempts to calibrate a surface runoff model with field data for a variety of chemical contaminants.

The attention given to surface runoff contaminant models has not matched the emphasis on pure hydrology models, in spite of their role in the generation of stream loading contaminant data. In the United States the EPA has had difficulty interpreting diverse proprietary contaminant models and has to develop its own models more often than conventional resource agencies, who, focused on flood forecasting, have had more of a centroid of common basin models.

== Example applications ==
Liden applied the HBV model to estimate the riverine transport of three different substances, nitrogen, phosphorus and suspended sediment in four different countries: Sweden, Estonia, Bolivia and Zimbabwe. The relation between internal hydrological model variables and nutrient transport was assessed. A model for nitrogen sources was developed and analysed in comparison with a statistical method. A model for suspended sediment transport in tropical and semi-arid regions was developed and tested. It was shown that riverine total nitrogen could be well simulated in the Nordic climate and riverine suspended sediment load could be estimated fairly well in tropical and semi-arid climates. The HBV model for material transport generally estimated material transport loads well. The main conclusion of the study was that the HBV model can be used to predict material transport on the scale of the drainage basin during stationary conditions, but cannot be easily generalised to areas not specifically calibrated. In a different work, Castanedo et al. applied an evolutionary algorithm to automated watershed model calibration.

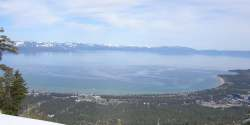
Lake Tahoe, headwater sub-basin of the Truckee River watershed

The United States EPA developed the DSSAM Model to analyze water quality impacts from land use and wastewater management decisions in the Truckee River basin, an area which include the cities of Reno and Sparks, Nevada as well as the Lake Tahoe basin. The model satisfactorily predicted nutrient, sediment and dissolved oxygen parameters in the river. It is based on a pollutant loading metric called "Total Maximum Daily Load" (TMDL). The success of this model contributed to the EPA's commitment to the use of the underlying TMDL protocol in EPA's national policy for management of many river systems in the United States.

The DSSAM Model is constructed to allow dynamic decay of most pollutants; for example, total nitrogen and phosphorus are allowed to be consumed by benthic algae in each time step, and the algal communities are given a separate population dynamic in each river reach (e.g. based upon river temperature). Regarding stormwater runoff in Washoe County, the specific elements within a new xeriscape ordinance were analyzed for efficacy using the model. For the varied agricultural uses in the watershed, the model was run to understand the principal sources of impact, and management practices were developed to reduce in-river pollution. Use of the model has specifically been conducted to analyze survival of two endangered species found in the Truckee River and Pyramid Lake: the Cui-ui sucker fish (endangered 1967) and the Lahontan cutthroat trout (threatened 1970).

== See also ==
- Aquifer
- Differential equation
- HBV model
- Hydrometry
- Infiltration
- Runoff model (reservoir)
- Storm Water Management Model
- United States Army Corps of Engineers
- WAFLEX model
- SWAT model
