= Water column =

Conceptual column of water from the surface to the bottom of a body of water

Deep sea water column

The (oceanic) water column is a concept used in oceanography to describe the physical (temperature, salinity, light penetration) and chemical (pH, dissolved oxygen, nutrient salts) characteristics of seawater at different depths for a defined geographical point. Generally, vertical profiles are made of temperature, salinity, and other chemical parameters at a defined point along the water column. The water column is the largest, yet one of the most under-explored, habitats on the planet; it is explored to better understand the ocean as a whole, including the huge biomass that lives there and its importance to the global carbon and other biogeochemical cycles. Studying the water column also provides understanding on the links between living organisms and environmental parameters, large-scale water circulation, and the transfer of matter between water masses.

Water columns are used chiefly for environmental studies evaluating the stratification or mixing of thermal or chemical layers in a lake, stream, or ocean. Some of the common parameters analyzed in the water column are pH, turbidity, temperature, hydrostatic pressure, salinity, total dissolved solids, various pesticides, pathogens, and a wide variety of chemicals and biota.

Descriptively, the deep sea water column is divided into five parts—pelagic zones (from Greek πέλαγος (pélagos), 'open sea')—from the surface to below the floor.

The term water column is also commonly used in scuba diving to describe the vertical space through which divers ascend and descend.

== Pelagic zones ==
The pelagic zones are as follows:

=== Epipelagic ===
The epipelagic zone, otherwise known as the sunlit zone or the euphotic zone, goes to a depth of about 200 meters (656 feet). It is the depth of water to which sunlight is able to penetrate. Although it is only 2 to 3 percent of the entire ocean, the epipelagic zone is home to a massive number of organisms. Among other organisms, the photic zone is home to vital communities of phytoplankton, zooplankton, and algae. These primary producers become the food source for hundreds of other organisms such as sharks, stingrays, tuna, and sea turtles. The epipelagic zone is incredibly important due to its productivity and ability to help remove carbon dioxide from the atmosphere.

=== Mesopelagic ===
The mesopelagic zone is a layer of the oceanic zone lying beneath the epipelagic zone and above the bathypelagic zone, at depths generally between 200 and 1,000 m (656 and 3,280 ft). The mesopelagic zone receives very little sunlight and is home to many bioluminescent organisms. Because food is scarce in this region, most mesopelagic organisms migrate to the surface to feed at night or live off the falling detritus from the epipelagic ecosystem.

=== Bathypelagic ===
The bathypelagic zone extends from about 1000 to 4000 meters below the surface. The bathypelagic zone receives no sunlight and water pressure is considerable. The abundance and diversity of marine life decreases with depth through this and the lower zones.

=== Abyssopelagic ===
The abyssopelagic zone is the portion of the ocean deeper than about 4,000 m (13,000 feet) and shallower than about 6,000 m (20,000 feet). The zone is defined mainly by its extremely uniform environmental conditions, as reflected in the distinct life forms inhabiting it. The abyss is largely unexplored, but it is known to contain animals found nowhere else on earth. It is also abundant in minerals frequently used in manufacturing. The bottom at these depths accounts for about one-third of the planet's seafloor. The sheer size of this area, coupled with the challenges of descending to depths where water pressure can reach 600 atmospheres, makes exploration difficult—but by no means impossible.

=== Hadopelagic ===
The hadopelagic (or hadal) zone, refers to depths below 6000 meters, which occur mostly in the deep ocean trenches. The term hadal is a reference to the Greek god of the underworld Hades. In these trenches, the temperature is just above freezing, and the water pressure is enormous. For example, the hadopelagic zone extends into the ocean's deepest trench, the Mariana Trench, located in the western Pacific Ocean basin, with a maximum depth of nearly 11,000 meters. At that depth, the water column above is exerting a pressure of over one thousand atmospheres.

== See also ==
- Hydrological transport model
