= 1960 Milwaukee Flood =

- Location: Milwaukee, Wisconsin
- Type: Gradual Rise
- Cause: Snow melt and rain
- Deaths: 0
- Injuries: 0
- Property damage: $226,000

The 1960 Milwaukee Flood occurred in mid-April 1960, in Milwaukee, Wisconsin. Intense rainfall combined with snowmelt and inadequate infrastructure led to widespread flooding through the city and surrounding towns. Damages were estimated to total several hundred thousand dollars. Flooding overwhelmed streets, homes, and Milwaukee's sewer system, revealing serious inadequacies in flood control.

== Flood control up to 1960 ==
Up until the 20th century, Milwaukee utilized minimal flood control practices, limited to wooden bridges and small culverts along primarily located along Lake Michigan. Few of the many streams and creeks running into Milwaukee were dredged or controlled. Dredging that had occurred was primarily for navigation rather than risk mitigation. Between 1910 and 1930, significant urbanization had occurred in Milwaukee, leading to an increased in paved surfaces, increasing runoff and risk. The Menomonee River was dredged around this time to reduce the threat of flooding in the industrial section of the city.

Milwaukee experienced a boom in population and industry following The Second World War. Rapid suburban expansion increased impervious surfaces without proportional sewer expansion. During this time, flood management primarily focused on storm sewer construction rather than integrated watershed management. By 1960, major river channelization projects were incomplete or outdated, leaving the city vulnerable to large runoff events.

== The 1960 Flood ==
Milwaukee saw above-average levels of rainfall for much of early and mid-April, and still had large piles of snow from previous March storms. As the ground became saturated, there became less and less space for this water to go. The increase in pavemented areas also lead to more runoff than historically observed in previous decades. Milwaukees early sewer and drain systems were too small for such buildup and runoff, and were inadequate in emptying the city into Lake Michigan. Downtown streets began to accumulate water slowly, with roads outside of town following soon after. After multiple days of sustained storms, roads and houses located downtown and along the Menomonee River began to flood. Basement flooding was severe, particularly in older residential areas with outdated lateral connections. Major roads and rail lines near river crossings were closed due to high water or bridge safety concerns. Businesses along the Menomonee River experienced costly flood damage to machinery, supplies, and building structures. The city deployed public works crews to clear blockages and pump water from critical facilities. Volunteers and neighborhood groups sandbagged threatened areas to protect homes.
