= GSSHA =

Two-dimensional model

- Developer: Engineer Research and Development Center
- Stable release: 6.0 / January 30, 2013; 13 years ago
- Written in: C++
- Operating system: Linux, Microsoft Windows
- Type: Hydrological modelling
- License: Public domain software
- Website: http://chl.erdc.usace.army.mil/gssha

GSSHA (Gridded Surface/Subsurface Hydrologic Analysis) is a two-dimensional, physically based watershed model developed by the Engineer Research and Development Center of the United States Army Corps of Engineers. It simulates surface water and groundwater hydrology, erosion and sediment transport. The GSSHA model is used for hydraulic engineering and research, and is on the Federal Emergency Management Agency (FEMA) list of hydrologic models accepted for use in the national flood insurance program for flood hydrograph estimation. Input is best prepared by the Watershed Modeling System interface, which effectively links the model with geographic information systems (GIS).

GSSHA uses a square-grid, constant grid-size representation of watershed topography and characteristics, similar to a digital elevation model representation. Relevant model parameters are assigned to the model grids using index maps. Index maps are often derived from soils, landuse/land cover, vegetation, or other physiographic maps.

== History ==
The GSSHA model was derived from the CASC2D hydrologic model. GSSHA represents a significant improvement on CASC2D in terms of capabilities, options, and numerical procedures. GSSHA includes dynamic time-stepping depending on stability criteria, different time steps for different numerical processes, and the ability to run on multi-processor computers. Processes included in GSSHA include surface and ground water flow, channel hydraulics, evapotranspiration, erosion and sedimentation, storm drainage networks, tile drains, a variety of hydraulic structures, and contaminant/nutrient fate and transport.

== Formulation ==
GSSHA uses a regular square grid computational discretization of the watershed. Elevation data are taken from a digital elevation model.

GSSHA uses a vector channel representation. This allows feature allows channels to flow in any direction and meander, independent from the grid resolution; this feature accurately preserves channel length and slope.

The GSSHA model was developed from the outset to be capable of 'long term' simulations consisting of multiple events. As such, required inputs include meteorological variables, and surface energy-balance parameters. Seasonality in evapotranspiration parameters is included in the model.

Overland and channel flow hydraulics are based on explicit, finite-volume, diffusive wave schemes. The overland and channel flow routines use dynamic time stepping to improve model stability and decrease simulation times.

Surface and subsurface stores are linked though the vadose zone using a number of different optional numerical methods. A two-dimensional finite-difference groundwater solver is coupled to streams through a stream bed conductance layer.

There are a number of optional methods to calculate erosion and sediment transport. The model can be used to simulate transport of sediments with specific gravity different from sand.

== Specific process simulation options ==
- Rainfall input
  - rain gages, inverse-distance squared or nearest neighbor interpolation
  - radar-rainfall
- Evapotranspiration using the Penman–Monteith equation
- Infiltration
  - Green-Ampt
  - Multi-layer Green-Ampt
  - Green-Ampt with redistribution
  - Richards equation
- Overland flow
  - Explicit finite-volume diffusive wave
  - Explicit finite-volume alternating-direction predictor-corrector diffusive wave
  - Overland flow dikes, such as roadway embankments
- Channel flow using explicit finite-volume diffusive-wave
- Hydraulic structures
  - Weirs
  - Culverts
  - Detention basins
  - Lakes
  - Wetlands
  - Rating curves
  - Rule curves
  - Scheduled releases
- Overland erosion and sediment transport
  - Detachment limits
  - Raindrop impact
  - Deposition
  - Arbitrary sediment size classes
  - Arbitrary sediment specific gravity
  - Sediment transport using three different optional equations
    - Kilinc and Richardson
    - Englund Hanson
    - Stream power
- Channel sediment transport
  - Sand routing using stream power
  - Fines routing using advection-diffusion
- Two-dimensional groundwater
  - Two-dimensional finite-difference scheme
  - Wells
  - Constant head and constant flux boundary conditions
  - Stream/aquifer interaction

Current additions to the GSSHA model include source/sink/transport of nutrients and contaminants.

== Computational specifics ==
GSSHA is programmed in C++, and runs on Windows or Linux computers. The model is command line driven and can be used in a batch mode. Parallel computing is enabled at present using the MPI or the OpenMP approach. Work is underway to port the code to run on massively parallel distributed memory architecture machines.

== Applications to date ==
- Flash flood modeling
- Soil moisture predictions
- Sediment loading to receiving water bodies
- Tidal and hurricane storm surge coastal flood forecasting
- Engineering design
- Hydrology education
- Hydrologic research
