= Vflo =

Vflo is a commercially available, physics-based distributed hydrologic model generated by Vieux & Associates, Inc. Vflo uses radar rainfall data for hydrologic input to simulate distributed runoff. Vflo employs GIS maps for parameterization via a desktop interface. The model is suited for distributed hydrologic forecasting in post-analysis and in continuous operations. Vflo output is in the form of hydrographs at selected drainage network grids, as well as distributed runoff maps covering the watershed. Model applications include civil infrastructure operations and maintenance, stormwater prediction and emergency management, continuous and short-term surface water runoff, recharge estimation, soil moisture monitoring, land use planning, water quality monitoring, and water resources management.

== History ==
Vflo considers the spatial character of the parameters and precipitation controlling hydrologic processes, and thus improves upon lumped representations previously used in hydrologic modeling. Historical practice has been to use lumped representations because of computational limitations or because sufficient data was not available to populate a distributed model database. Advances in computational speed; development of high-resolution precipitation data from radar and satellites; and availability of worldwide digital data sets and GIS technology makes distributed, physics-based modeling possible. Vflo is designed to take advantage of the spatial variability of high resolution radar rainfall input, GIS datasets, and hydraulic channel characteristics. Because it is physics-based, it produces hydrographs based on conservation equations and the hydraulics of the drainage network, and can be employed in locations where there are no rain gauges or previous modeling studies. In addition, Vflo’s network approach makes models scalable from upland watersheds to river basins using the same drainage network.

== Formulation ==
Vflo is suited for distributed hydrologic forecasting in post-analysis and continuous operations. Vflo models may be calibrated by loading precipitation maps for historical events and comparing simulated volume/peak hydrographs to observed hydrographs. Elevation data are taken from a digital elevation model. A vector channel representation is employed. Parameterization utilizes digital data sets at any resolution, including LIDAR terrain data and other digital maps of impervious area, soils, and land use/cover. Vflo is developed to utilize multi-sensor inputs from radar, satellites, rain gauges, or model forecasts. The kinematic wave analogy is used to represent hydraulic conditions in a watershed.

== Specific simulation options ==
- Rainfall input
  - Radar-rainfall: UF, ASCII, NEXRAD Level II, CSV
  - Satellite data
  - Rain gauges, Barnes objective analysis
  - Quantitative precipitation estimates from model forecasts
  - Multi-sensor precipitation estimates
- Evapotranspiration
- Snowmelt
- Sensitivity analysis
- Inundation mapping
- Infiltration
  - Enhanced Green-Ampt infiltration module with initial saturation calibration factor (slider), saturated hydraulic conductivity, wetting front suction, effective porosity, and soil depth
  - Abstraction and impervious area parameters with ASCII import/export
- Overland flow
  - Manning's equation
- Channel flow
  - Kinematic Wave Analogy
  - Modified Puls
  - Observed flow
  - Looped rating curve modification (Jones method)
  - Rating curves and cross sections for complex hydraulics
- Flood watch points
- Design storms, SCS, user generated

== Applications ==
- Continuous and short-term surface water runoff
- Stormwater prediction and management
- Flash flood forecasting
- Operational flood alert
- Flood event reconstruction
- Design Storm development
- Recharge estimation
- Soil moisture monitoring
- Hydrology and Hydraulics studies
- Land use planning scenarios
- Water quality studies
- Hydropower management
- Hydrology education
- Hydrologic research
