= SHETRAN =

SHETRAN is a hydrological modelling system for water flow, solute and sediment transport in river catchments. SHETRAN is a physically based, distributed model (PBDM) that can simulate the entire land phase of the hydrologic cycle including surface water flow and groundwater flow. The plan area of the catchment in SHETRAN is usually in the range of one to a few thousand square kilometres and the horizontal depth of the subsurface is usually less than 100m.

In the 1980s the Système Hydrologique Européen (SHE) model was developed by a consortium of three European organizations: the Institute of Hydrology (the United Kingdom), SOGREAH (France) and DHI (Denmark). Its successors are MIKE SHE (DHI) and SHETRAN (School of Civil Engineering and Geosciences, Newcastle University).

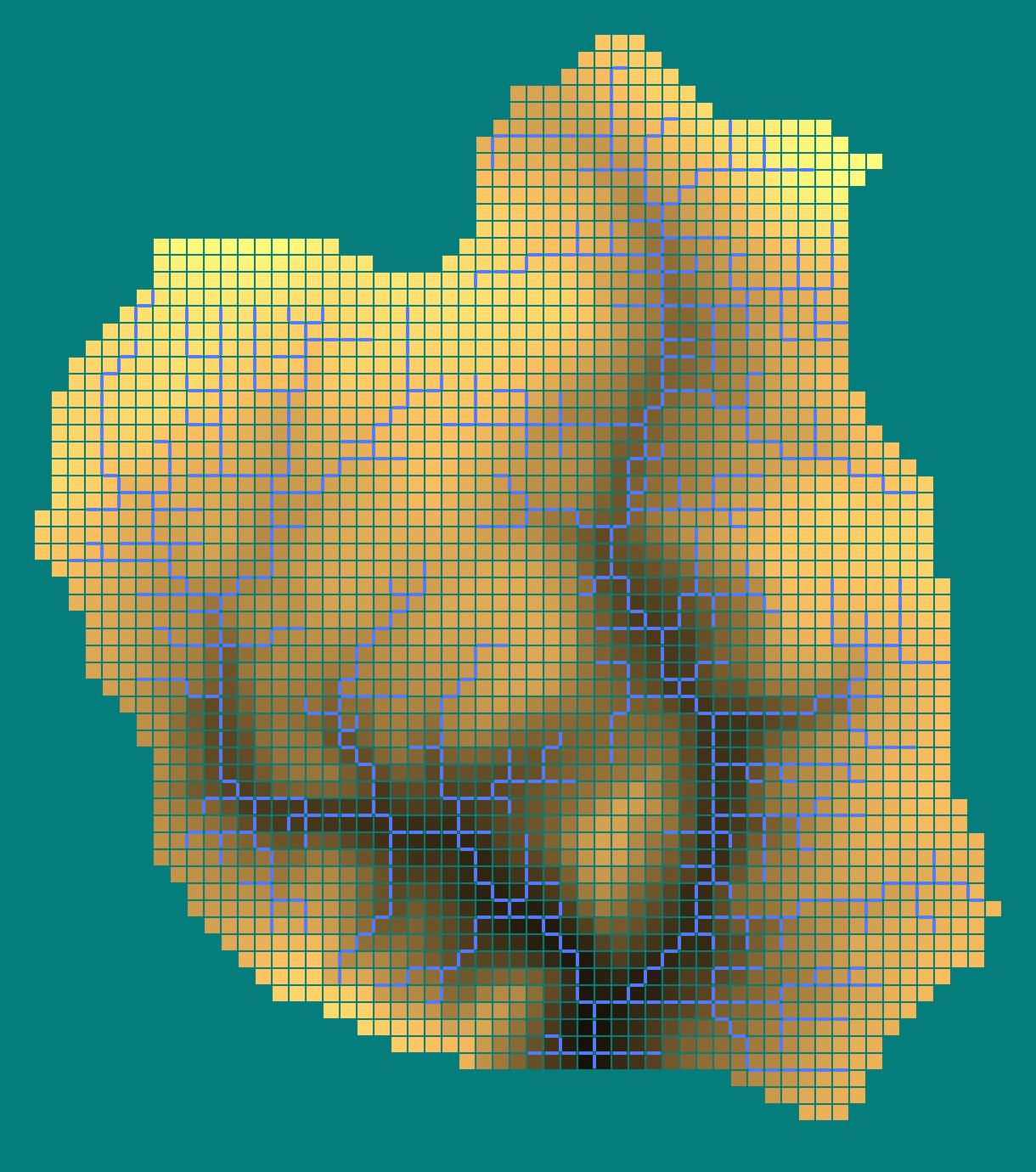
Shetran plan view of the Dunsop catchment

The SHE model was renamed SHETRAN at School of Civil Engineering and Geosciences, Newcastle University, after the introduction of the sediment and solute transport component. Since then it has undergone further improvements. The biggest change was the introduction of a fully 3-dimensional subsurface or variably saturated subsurface (VSS) component. Recent changes have focused on making the model more user friendly with the introduction of a Graphical user interface. This includes the automatic generation of river channels from a Digital elevation model so that a catchment simulation can be set up rapidly.

== See also ==
- Hydrological transport model
