= Green Kenue =

Green Kenue (formerly EnSim Hydrologic) is an advanced data preparation, analysis, and visualization tool for hydrologic modellers. It is a Windows/OpenGL-based graphical user interface, integrating environmental databases and geo-spatial data with model input and results data. Green Kenue provides complete pre- and post-processing for the WATFLOOD and HBV-EC hydrologic models. Also included is a 1D "reach scale" unsteady hydrodynamic flow solver, Gen1D.

== Visualization and Animation ==
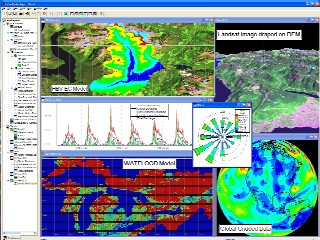

Visualization in Green Kenue is provided by dynamic 1D, Polar, 2D, 3D and Spherical views that can be recorded as digital movies or saved as images for inclusion in reports or presentations.

All views and data are fully geo-referenced and coordinate conversion between common projections is supported.

== Data Formats/Types ==
Green Kenue provides support for a full-featured set of data types commonly used by hydrologic modellers. ASCII and Binary native file formats (for static and temporally-varying data) are available.

- Time-series (scalar and vector)
- Tabular data, Distributions, Velocity roses
- Multi-attribute point-sets
- Multi-attribute line-sets
- Multi-attribute networks
- Rectangular gridded data (scalar and vector)
- Triangular gridded data (scalar and vector)

Green Kenue supports import and export for common GIS data formats including:

- ArcINFO/ArcView,
- MapInfo,
- GeoTIFF,
- DTED/CDED,
- BIL,
- SRTM,
- WMO-GRIB,
- Surfer

== Digital Elevation Map Processing ==
The watershed basin and stream delineation tool uses either the Jenson or At Search algorithm and allows for artificial diversions. A suite of sophisticated basin metrics and digital elevation map analysis tools is provided, including statistical and analysis functions such as temporal min, max, mean, standard deviation, slope and curvature analysis, hypsography, stream power, and relief potential. For more sophisticated analysis, a powerful algebraic calculator for gridded data is available.

== Environmental Databases ==
Green Kenue provides an interface to Environment Canada's hydrometric station database (HYDAT) as well as the Canadian Daily Climate Database (CDCD). Stations are queried interactively and available time series data can be extracted, re-sampled, analyzed, and processed with various editors and calculators. Users can also load and analyze gridded weather forecast datasets in GRIB or FST format.

== See also ==
Hydrology

HBV hydrology model
