= WAFLEX =

Model of rivers

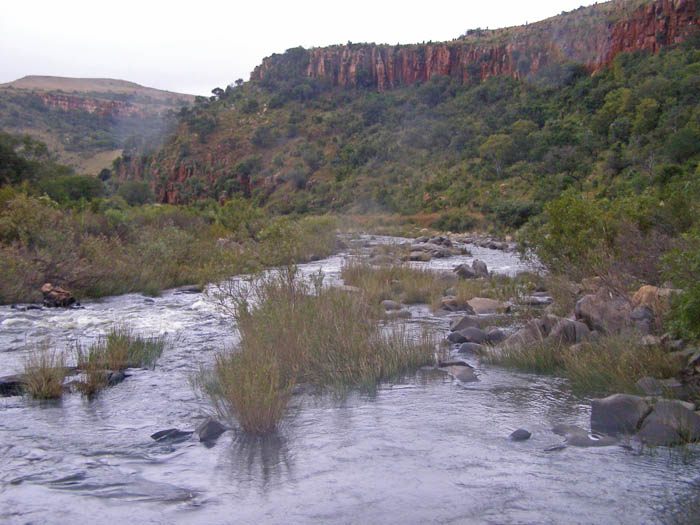
Headwaters of the Inkomati River near Carolina, South Africa. WAFLEX has been used to model this drainage basin to improve transboundary water allocation.

WAFLEX is a spreadsheet-based model. It can be used to analyse upstream-downstream interactions, dam management options and water allocation and development options.

== Structure of the Model ==
WAFLEX is set up as a network, where each cell is river reach, demand node or reservoir. Each cell contains a simple formula to add water flowing into it from adjacent cells, and to subtract any demand connected to that cell. The network is set up twice, in demand mode and in supply mode.

The inputs to WAFLEX are:

- river inflow time series - source area of where the model starts
- demand node time series, e.g. a settlement water supply
- reservoir rule curves and dimensions
- time series from gauges for calibration

The outputs of WAFLEX are:

- time series for specified points on the rivers - these can be calibrated against gauges
- time series of abstractions and shortages for each demand node
- time series of reservoir levels

Code can be readily added to generate the above outputs graphically.

== Application ==
WAFLEX has been applied extensively, especially in southern Africa and South America, including for:

- Water allocation: between Eswatini, South Africa and Mozambique on the transboundary Inkomati River, in the Conapu Basin in Trinidad, in the Thuli Basin, Zimbabwe, and to model shortages and water allocation in the middle Heihe River in China.
- Modelling environmental flow requirements of the Odzi River in Zimbabwe.
- Modelling conjunctive use of groundwater and interbasin transfers in the North China Plain
- Water quality modelling and mass balance of the Jubones River in Ecuador and the Kafue River in Zambia.

== See also ==
- Hydrological transport model
