= Potamal =

Potamal is a technical geographical term of limnology and hydrology of the lower stretches of a stream or river. It describes the overall habitat, stability and ecology of the biomass.
