= Double mass analysis =

Double mass analysis is a simple graphical method to evaluate the consistency of hydrological data. The DM approach plots the cumulative data of one variable against the cumulative data of a second variable. A break in the slope of a linear function fit to the data is thought to represent a change in the relation between the variables. This approach provides a robust method to determine a change in the behavior of precipitation and recharge in a simple graphical method. It is a commonly used data analysis approach for investigating the behaviour of records made of hydrological or meteorological data at a number of locations. It is used to determine whether there is a need for corrections to the data - to account for changes in data collection procedures or other local conditions. Such changes may result from a variety of things including changes in instrumentation, changes in observation procedures, or changes in gauge location or surrounding conditions. Double mass analysis for checking consistency of a hydrological or meteorological record is considered to be an essential tool before taking it for analysis purpose. This method is based on the hypothesis that each item of the recorded data of a population is consistent.

An example of a double mass analysis is a "double mass plot", or "double mass curve". For this, points and/or a joining line are plotted where the x- and y- coordinates are determined by the running totals of the values observed at two stations. If both stations are affected to the same extent by the same trends then a double mass curve should follow a straight line. A break in the slope of the curve would indicate that conditions have changed at one location but not at another. Breaks in the double-mass curve of such variables are caused by changes in the relation between the variables. These changes may be due to changes in the method of data collection or to physical changes that affect the relation. This technique is based on the principle that when each recorded data comes from the same parent population, they are consistent.

== Procedure for Data Correction ==
Let $(x_i, y_i)$ be the data points then the procedure for double mass analysis is as follows;

- Divide the data into $n_i$ distinct categories of equal slope ($S_i$).
- Obtain correction factor for category $n_{i+1}$ as; $c_i = \frac{S_i}{S_{i+1}}$
- Multiply $n_{i+1}$ category with $c_i$ to get corrected data.
- After correction, repeat this process until all data points have the same slope.

== See also ==
- Statistics
