= HBV hydrology model =

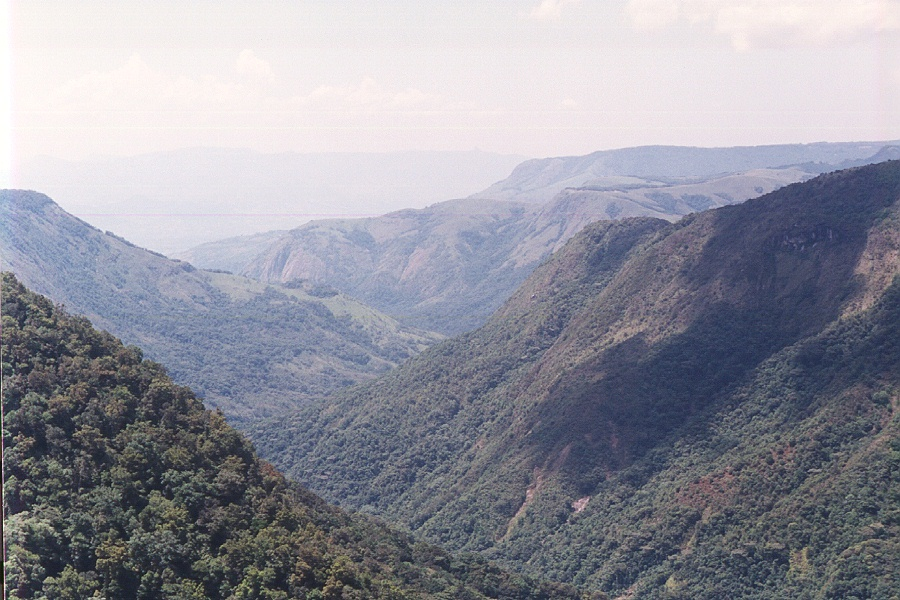
Headwaters of the Pungwe River; HBV has been used to model this drainage basin

The HBV hydrology model, or Hydrologiska Byråns Vattenbalansavdelning model, is a computer simulation used to analyze river discharge and water pollution. Developed originally for use in Scandinavia, this hydrological transport model has also been applied in a large number of catchments on most continents.

== Discharge modelling ==
This is the major application of HBV, and has gone through much refinement. It comprises the following routines:

- Snow routine
- Soil moisture routine
- Response function
- Routing routine

The HBV model is a lumped (or semi-distributed) bucket-type (or also called 'conceptual') catchment model that has relatively few model parameters and minimal forcing input requirements, usually the daily temperature and the daily precipitation. First, the snow is calculated after defining a threshold melting temperature (TT usually 0 °C) and a parameter CMELT that reflects the equivalent melted snow for the difference of temperature. The result is divided into a surface runoff part and a part that enters the soil by infiltration. Second, the soil moisture is calculated after defining an initial value and the field capacity (FC). Third, the actual Evapotranspiration (ETPa) is calculated, first by using an external model (such as Penman-Monteith) for finding the potential ETP and then fitting the result to the temperatures and the permanent wilting point(PWP) of the catchment in question. A parameter C which reflects the increase in the ETP with the differences in temperatures (Actual Temperature and Monthly mean Temperature). The model considers the catchment as two reservoirs (S1 and S2) connected by a percolation flow. The inflow to the first reservoir is calculated as the surface runoff, which is what remains from the initial precipitation after calculating the infiltration and the evapotranspiration. The outflow from the first reservoir is divided into two separate flows (Q1 and Q2), where Q1 represents the fast flow which is triggered after a certain threshold L (defined by the user or by calibration) and Q2 represents the intermediate flow. A constant K1 is used to find the outflows as a function of the storage in S1. The percolation rate depends on a constant Kd along with the storage in S1. The outflow from the second reservoir is considered to be the groundwater flow (Q3), a function of a constant K2 and the storage in S2. The total flow generated from a certain rain event is the sum of the 3 flows.

Calibration. The result of the model are later compared to the actual measured flow values and Nash-Sutcliffe parameter is used to calibrate the model by changing the different parameters. The model has 9 parameters in total: TT, Cmelt, FC, C, PWP, L, K1, K2, Kd. For a good calibration of the model it is better to use Monte-Carlo simulation or the GLUE method to properly define the parameters and the uncertainty in the model. The model is fairly reliable but as usual the need of good input data is essential for good results. The sensitivity of the HBV model to parameter uncertainty has been explored revealing significant parameter interactions affecting calibration uniqueness, and some state dependence.

Applications. HBV has been used to simulate river discharge in many countries worldwide, including Brazil, China, Iran, Mozambique, Sweden, Switzerland and Zimbabwe. The HBV has also been used to simulate internal variables such as groundwater levels. The model has also been used for hydrological change detection studies and climate-change impact studies.

Versions. The HBV model exists in several versions. One version, which has been especially designed for education with a user-friendly graphical user interface, is HBV light. HBV emulation is available as a part of Raven hydrologic framework. Raven is an open-source robust and flexible hydrological modelling framework, designed for application to challenging hydrological problems in academia and practice. This fully object-oriented code provides complete flexibility in spatial discretization, interpolation, process representation, and forcing function generation.

== Sediment and solute modelling ==
The HBV model can also simulate the riverine transport of sediment and dissolved solids. Lidén simulated the transport of nitrogen, phosphorus and suspended sediment in Brazil, Estonia, Sweden and Zimbabwe.

== See also ==
- Hydrological transport model
- Runoff model
