= DHI (company) =

Danish software and consulting company

DHI, previously known as DHI - Institut for Vand og Miljø (DHI – Institute for Water and Environment), is an international software development and engineering consultant firm headquartered in Denmark which specializes in hydraulic and hydrological modeling software.

While independent, DHI is associated with the Danish Academy of Technical Sciences and maintains a partnership with the United Nations Environment Programme focused on management of water resources. DHI's 2015 corporate revenue was about €119.5M. Its headquarters are in Hørsholm; another centre is in Singapore. Among its recent consulting projects as of 2016 are a study of the causes of the 2011 flooding in Grantham, Queensland, Australia, an analysis of five Himalayan rivers as part of the Uttarakhand Disaster Recovery Project and research on effects of planned dams on the River Mekong.

== History ==
Originating in an institute founded in 1964, DHI has about 30 offices throughout the world, with software development centres in Singapore and Hørsholm, Denmark, and approximately 1050 employees.

DHI takes its name from the acronym of the Dansk Hydraulisk Institut (Danish Hydraulic Institute), which was founded in 1964 by the Technical University of Denmark as Vandbygningsinstituttet (The Institute of Water Production) and changed its name in 1971; DHI - Institut for Vand og Miljø was formed in 2000 by the merger of that with Vandkvalitetsinstituttet (The Institute for Water Quality), and in 2005 further merged with the Dansk Toksikologi Center (Danish Toxicology Centre) and simplified its name to DHI.

== Software ==
- FEFLOW
- Litpack("Littoral processes and coastline kinetics) is simulation software for coastal sediment transport. US Army Corps of Engineers study compared this program to two others, GenCade and Unibest, and found "notable differences" in predictions of shoreline change models.
- MIKE 3, MIKE 11, MIKE 21, MIKE 21C, MIKE FLOOD: computer programs that simulates flow and water level, water quality and sediment transport in rivers, flood plains, irrigation canals, reservoirs and other inland water bodies.
- MIKE HYDRO BASIN: an extension of ArcMap (ESRI) for integrated water resources management and planning.
- MIKE SHE: An integrated hydrological modelling system used to simulate the terrestrial phase of the hydrologic cycle, including surface water and groundwater interactions. Originating from the Système Hydrologique Européen (SHE) developed in 1977 by a consortium consisting of the Institute of Hydrology, SOGREAH, and DHI, it is applied in water resource planning, river basin management, and environmental impact assessments of land use and climate change.
- MIKE URBAN
- MOUSE: a computer program that models collection system for urban wastewater and stormwater.
- Temporal Analyst: an extension for storage, management, processing, plotting and analysis of virtually any time-related data inside ArcGIS, brings time series data management directly into ArcGIS and provides fully dynamic data handling, modeling and monitoring.
