= Runoff model (reservoir) =

Type of water motion

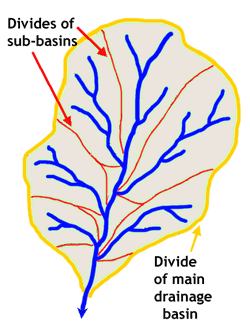
A watershed or drainage basin

A runoff models or rainfall-runoff model describes how rainfall is converted into runoff in a drainage basin (catchment area or watershed). More precisely, it produces a surface runoff hydrograph in response to a rainfall event, represented by and input as a hyetograph. Rainfall-runoff models need to be calibrated before they can be used.

A well known runoff model is the linear reservoir, but in practice it has limited applicability. The runoff model with a non-linear reservoir is more universally applicable, but still it holds only for catchments whose surface area is limited by the condition that the rainfall can be considered more or less uniformly distributed over the area. The maximum size of the watershed then depends on the rainfall characteristics of the region. When the study area is too large, it can be divided into sub-catchments and the various runoff hydrographs may be combined using flood routing techniques.

== Linear reservoir ==
Figure 1. A linear reservoir

The hydrology of a linear reservoir (figure 1) is governed by two equations.

1. flow equation: $Q = A \cdot S$, with units [L/T], where L is length (e.g. mm) and T is time (e.g. h, day)
2. continuity or water balance equation: $R = Q + \frac{dS}{dT}$, with units [L/T]

where:
Q is the runoff or discharge
R is the effective rainfall or rainfall excess or recharge
A is the constant reaction factor or response factor with unit [1/T]
S is the water storage with unit [L]
dS is a differential or small increment of S
dT is a differential or small increment of T

Runoff equation
A combination of the two previous equations results in a differential equation, whose solution is:

- $Q_2 = Q_1 \exp\left(-A (T_2 - T_1)\right) + R\left[1 - \exp\left(-A (T_2 - T_1)\right)\right]$

This is the runoff equation or discharge equation, where Q1 and Q2 are the values of Q at time T1 and T2 respectively while T2−T1 is a small time step during which the recharge can be assumed constant.

Computing the total hydrograph
Provided the value of A is known, the total hydrograph can be obtained using a successive number of time steps and computing, with the runoff equation, the runoff at the end of each time step from the runoff at the end of the previous time step.

Unit hydrograph
The discharge may also be expressed as: Q = − dS/dT . Substituting herein the expression of Q in equation (1) gives the differential equation dS/dT = A·S, of which the solution is: S = exp(− A·t) . Replacing herein S by Q/A according to equation (1), it is obtained that: Q = A exp(− A·t) . This is called the instantaneous unit hydrograph (IUH) because the Q herein equals Q2 of the foregoing runoff equation using R = 0, and taking S as unity which makes Q1 equal to A according to equation (1).
The availability of the foregoing runoff equation eliminates the necessity of calculating the total hydrograph by the summation of partial hydrographs using the IUH as is done with the more complicated convolution method.

Determining the response factor A
When the response factor A can be determined from the characteristics of the watershed (catchment area), the reservoir can be used as a deterministic model or analytical model, see hydrological modelling.
Otherwise, the factor A can be determined from a data record of rainfall and runoff using the method explained below under non-linear reservoir. With this method the reservoir can be used as a black box model.

Conversions
1 mm/day corresponds to 10 m^{3}/day per ha of the watershed
1 L/s per ha corresponds to 8.64 mm/day or 86.4 m^{3}/day per ha

== Non-linear reservoir ==
Figure 2. A non-linear reservoir

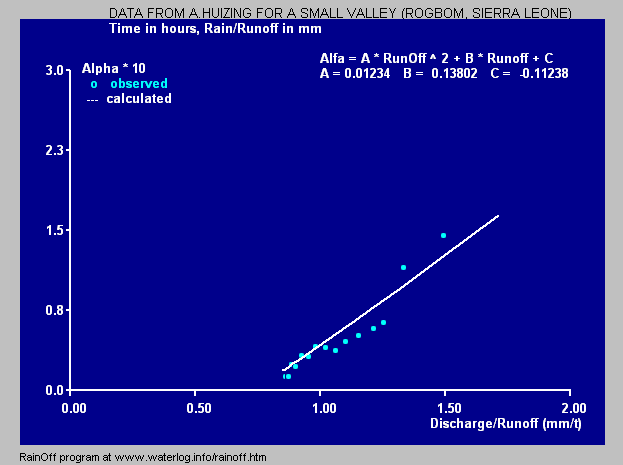
Figure 3. The reaction factor (Aq, Alpha) versus discharge (Q) for a small valley (Rogbom) in Sierra Leone

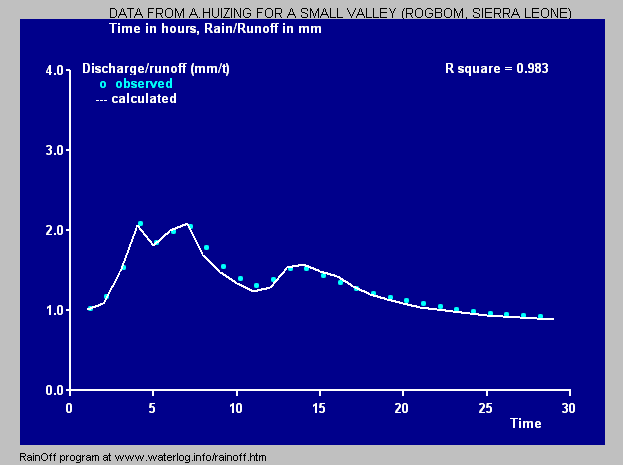
Figure 4. Actual and simulated discharge, Rogbom valley

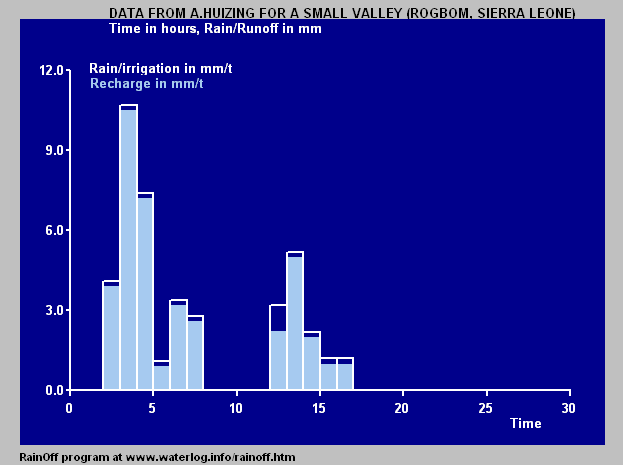
Figure 5. Rainfall and recharge, Rogbom valley

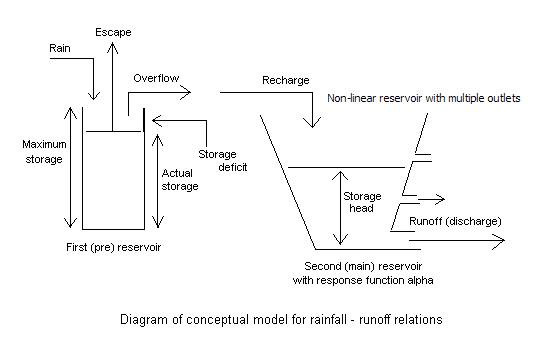
Figure 6. Non-linear reservoir with pre-reservoir for recharge

Contrary to the linear reservoir, the non linear reservoir has a reaction factor A that is not a constant, but it is a function of S or Q (figure 2, 3).

Normally A increases with Q and S because the higher the water level is the higher the discharge capacity becomes. The factor is therefore called Aq instead of A.
The non-linear reservoir has no usable unit hydrograph.

During periods without rainfall or recharge, i.e. when R = 0, the runoff equation reduces to

- Q2 = Q1 exp { − Aq (T2 − T1) }, or:

or, using a unit time step (T2 − T1 = 1) and solving for Aq:

- Aq = − ln (Q2/Q1)

Hence, the reaction or response factor Aq can be determined from runoff or discharge measurements using unit time steps during dry spells, employing a numerical method.

Figure 3 shows the relation between Aq (Alpha) and Q for a small valley (Rogbom) in Sierra Leone.
Figure 4 shows observed and simulated or reconstructed discharge hydrograph of the watercourse at the downstream end of the same valley.

== Recharge ==
Figure 7. Runoff from the water balance

The recharge, also called effective rainfall or rainfall excess, can be modeled by a pre-reservoir (figure 6) giving the recharge as overflow. The pre-reservoir knows the following elements:

- a maximum storage (Sm) with unit length [L]
- an actual storage (Sa) with unit [L]
- a relative storage: Sr = Sa/Sm
- a maximum escape rate (Em) with units length/time [L/T]. It corresponds to the maximum rate of evaporation plus percolation and groundwater recharge, which will not take part in the runoff process (figure 5, 6)
- an actual escape rate: Ea = Sr·Em
- a storage deficiency: Sd = Sm + Ea − Sa

The recharge during a unit time step (T2−T1=1) can be found from R = Rain − Sd
The actual storage at the end of a unit time step is found as Sa2 = Sa1 + Rain − R − Ea, where Sa1 is the actual storage at the start of the time step.

The Curve Number method (CN method) gives another way to calculate the recharge. The initial abstraction herein compares with Sm − Si, where Si is the initial value of Sa.

== Nash model ==
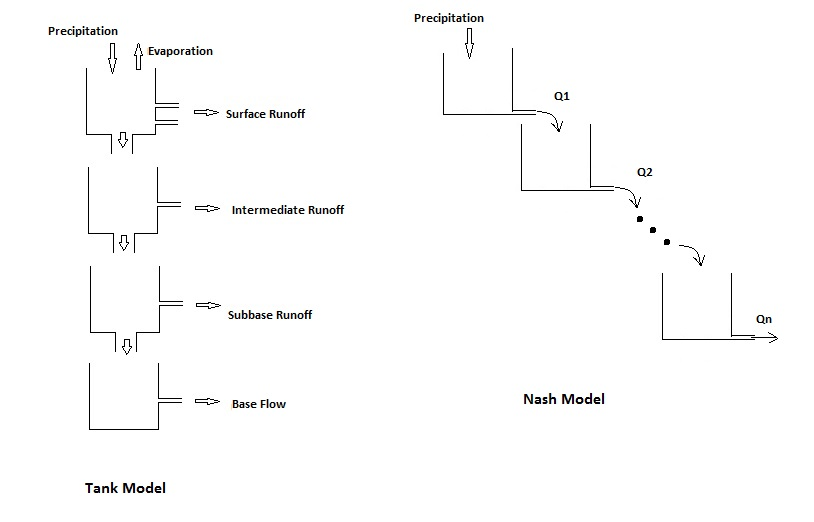
The Nash Model uses a cascade of linear reservoirs to predict streamflow. Software for this model exists.

The Nash model uses a series (cascade) of linear reservoirs in which each reservoir empties into the next until the runoff is obtained. For calibration, the model requires considerable research.

== Software ==
Figures 3 and 4 were made with the RainOff program, designed to analyse rainfall and runoff using the non-linear reservoir model with a pre-reservoir. The program also contains an example of the hydrograph of an agricultural subsurface drainage system for which the value of A can be obtained from the system's characteristics.

Raven is a robust and flexible hydrological modelling framework, designed for application to challenging hydrological problems in academia and practice. This fully object-oriented code provides complete flexibility in spatial discretization, interpolation, process representation, and forcing function generation. Models built with Raven can be as simple as a single watershed lumped model with only a handful of state variables to a full semi-distributed system model with physically-based infiltration, snowmelt, and routing. This flexibility encourages stepwise modelling while enabling investigation into critical research issues regarding discretization, numerical implementation, and ensemble simulation of surface water hydrological models. Raven is open source, covered under the Artistic License 2.0.

The SMART hydrological model includes agricultural subsurface drainage flow, in addition to soil and groundwater reservoirs, to simulate the flow path contributions to streamflow.

Vflo is another software program for modeling runoff. Vflo uses radar rainfall and GIS data to generate physics-based, distributed runoff simulation.

The WEAP (Water Evaluation And Planning) software platform models runoff and percolation from climate and land use data, using a choice of linear and non-linear reservoir models.

The RS MINERVE software platform simulates the formation of free surface run-off flow and its propagation in rivers or channels. The software is based on object-oriented programming and allows hydrologic and hydraulic modeling according to a semi-distributed conceptual scheme with different rainfall-runoff model such as HBV, GR4J, SAC-SMA or SOCONT.

The IHACRES is a catchment-scale rainfall-streamflow modelling methodology. Its purpose is to assist the hydrologist or water resources engineer to characterise the dynamic relationship between basin rainfall and streamflow.
