= Hydrological model =

Predicting and managing water resources

A hydrologic model is a simplification of a real-world system (e.g., surface water, soil water, wetland, groundwater, estuary) that aids in understanding, predicting, and managing water resources. Both the flow and quality of water are commonly studied using hydrologic models.

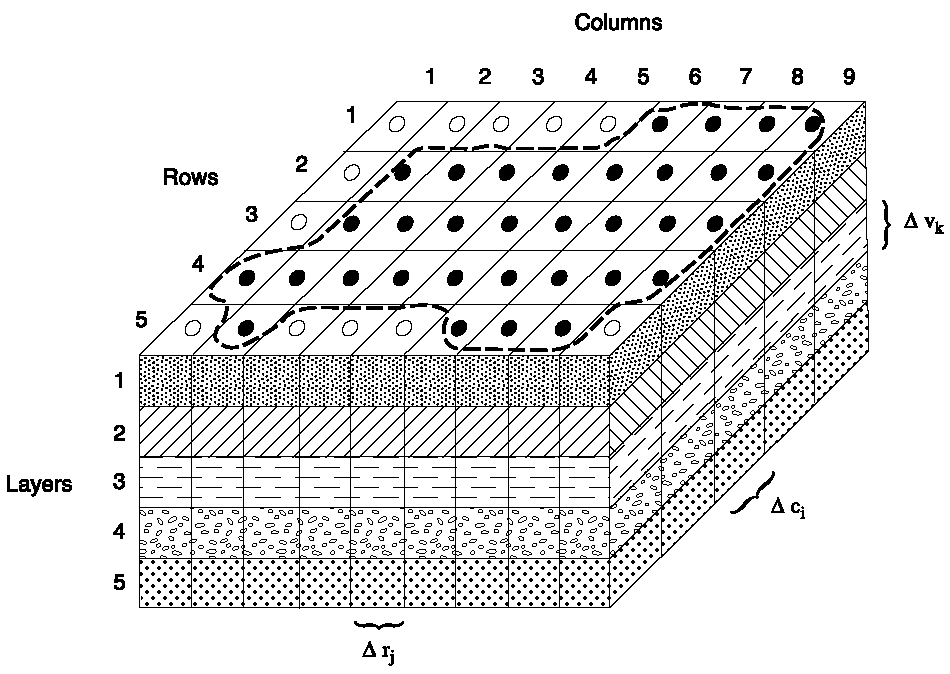
MODFLOW, a computational groundwater flow model based on methods developed by the US Geological Survey.

== Analog models ==
Prior to the advent of computer models, hydrologic modeling used analog models to simulate flow and transport systems. Unlike mathematical models that use equations to describe, predict, and manage hydrologic systems, analog models use non-mathematical approaches to simulate hydrology.

Two general categories of analog models are common; scale analogs that use miniaturized versions of the physical system and process analogs that use comparable physics (e.g., electricity, heat, diffusion) to mimic the system of interest.

=== Scale analogs ===
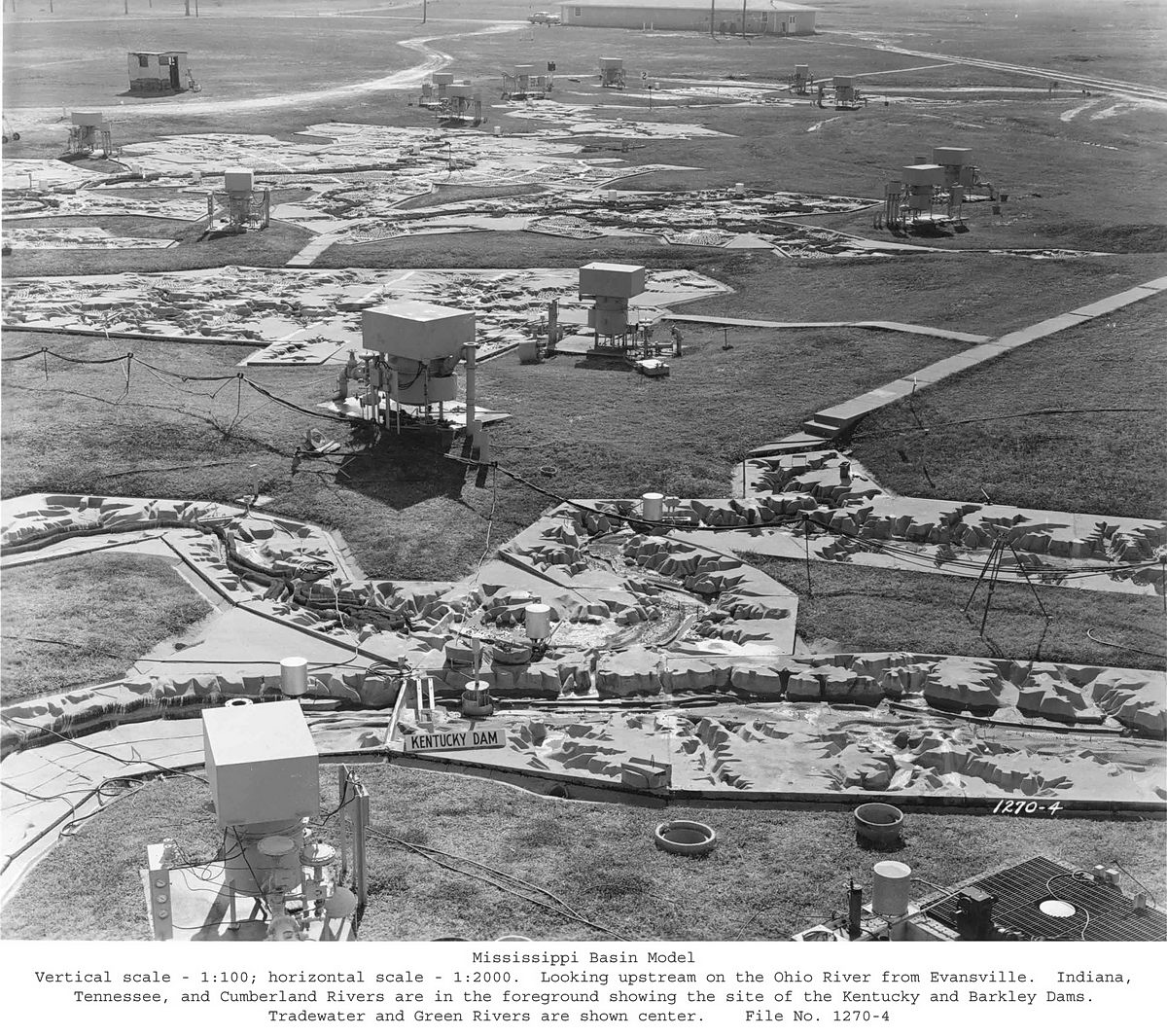
Detail of the Mississippi River Basin Model (US Army Corps of Engineers, 2006)

Scale models offer a useful approximation of physical or chemical processes at a size that allows for greater ease of visualization. The model may be created in one (core, column), two (plan, profile), or three dimensions, and can be designed to represent a variety of specific initial and boundary conditions as needed to answer a question.

Scale models commonly use physical properties that are similar to their natural counterparts (e.g., gravity, temperature). Yet, maintaining some properties at their natural values can lead to erroneous predictions. Properties such as viscosity, friction, and surface area must be adjusted to maintain appropriate flow and transport behavior. This usually involves matching dimensionless ratios (e.g., Reynolds number, Froude number).

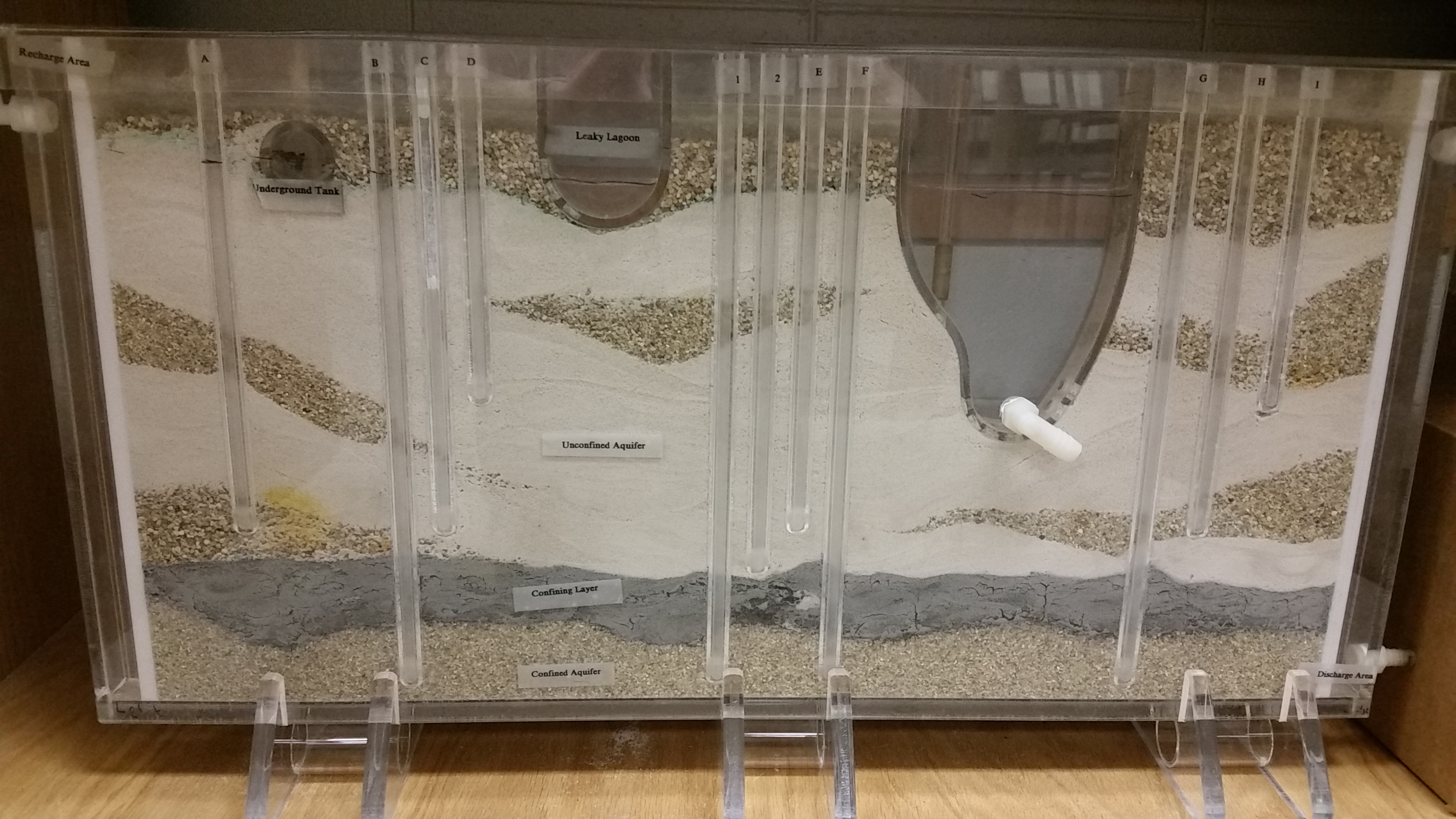
A two-dimensional scale model of an aquifer.

Groundwater flow can be visualized using a scale model built of acrylic and filled with sand, silt, and clay. Water and tracer dye may be pumped through this system to represent the flow of the simulated groundwater. Some physical aquifer models are between two and three dimensions, with simplified boundary conditions simulated using pumps and barriers.

=== Process analogs ===
Process analogs are used in hydrology to represent fluid flow using the similarity between Darcy's law, Ohm's law, Fourier's law, and Fick's law. The analogs to fluid flow are the flux of electricity, heat, and solutes, respectively. The corresponding analogs to fluid potential are voltage, temperature, and solute concentration (or chemical potential). The analogs to hydraulic conductivity are electrical conductivity, thermal conductivity, and the solute diffusion coefficient.

An early process analog model was an electrical network model of an aquifer composed of resistors in a grid. Voltages were assigned along the outer boundary, and then measured within the domain. Electrical conductivity paper can also be used instead of resistors.

== Statistical models ==
Statistical models are a type of mathematical model that are commonly used in hydrology to describe data, as well as relationships between data. Using statistical methods, hydrologists develop empirical relationships between observed variables, find trends in historical data, or forecast probable storm or drought events.

=== Moments ===
Statistical moments (e.g., mean, standard deviation, skewness, kurtosis) are used to describe the information content of data. These moments can then be used to determine an appropriate frequency distribution, which can then be used as a probability model. Two common techniques include L-moment ratios and Moment-Ratio Diagrams.

The frequency of extremal events, such as severe droughts and storms, often requires the use of distributions that focus on the tail of the distribution, rather than the data nearest the mean. These techniques, collectively known as extreme value analysis, provide a methodology for identifying the likelihood and uncertainty of extreme events. Examples of extreme value distributions include the Gumbel, Pearson, and generalized extreme value. The standard method for determining peak discharge uses the log-Pearson Type III (log-gamma) distribution and observed annual flow peaks.

=== Correlation analysis ===
The degree and nature of correlation may be quantified, by using a method such as the Pearson correlation coefficient, autocorrelation, or the T-test. The degree of randomness or uncertainty in the model may also be estimated using stochastics, or residual analysis. These techniques may be used in the identification of flood dynamics, storm characterization, and groundwater flow in karst systems.

Regression analysis is used in hydrology to determine whether a relationship may exist between independent and dependent variables. Bivariate diagrams are the most commonly used statistical regression model in the physical sciences, but there are a variety of models available from simplistic to complex. In a bivariate diagram, a linear or higher-order model may be fitted to the data.

Factor analysis and principal component analysis are multivariate statistical procedures used to identify relationships between hydrologic variables.

Convolution is a mathematical operation on two different functions to produce a third function. With respect to hydrologic modeling, convolution can be used to analyze stream discharge's relationship to precipitation. Convolution is used to predict discharge downstream after a precipitation event. This type of model would be considered a "lag convolution", because of the predicting of the "lag time" as water moves through the watershed using this method of modeling.

Time-series analysis is used to characterize temporal correlation within a data series as well as between different time series. Many hydrologic phenomena are studied within the context of historical probability. Within a temporal dataset, event frequencies, trends, and comparisons may be made by using the statistical techniques of time series analysis. The questions that are answered through these techniques are often important for municipal planning, civil engineering, and risk assessments.

Markov chains are a mathematical technique for determine the probability of a state or event based on a previous state or event. The event must be dependent, such as rainy weather. Markov Chains were first used to model rainfall event length in days in 1976, and continues to be used for flood risk assessment and dam management.

== Data-driven models ==
Data-driven models in hydrology emerged as an alternative approach to traditional statistical models, offering a more flexible and adaptable methodology for analysing and predicting various aspects of hydrological processes. While statistical models rely on rigorous assumptions about probability distributions, data-driven models leverage techniques from artificial intelligence, machine learning, and statistical analysis, including correlation analysis, time series analysis, and statistical moments, to learn complex patterns and dependencies from historical data. This allows them to make more accurate predictions and provide insights into the underlying processes.

Since their inception in the latter half of the 20th century, data-driven models have gained popularity in the water domain, as they help improve forecasting, decision-making, and management of water resources. A couple of notable publications that use data-driven models in hydrology include "Application of machine learning techniques for rainfall-runoff modelling" by Solomatine and Siek (2004), and "Data-driven modelling approaches for hydrological forecasting and prediction" by Valipour et al. (2021). These models are commonly used for predicting rainfall, runoff, groundwater levels, and water quality, and have proven to be valuable tools for optimizing water resource management strategies.

== Conceptual models ==
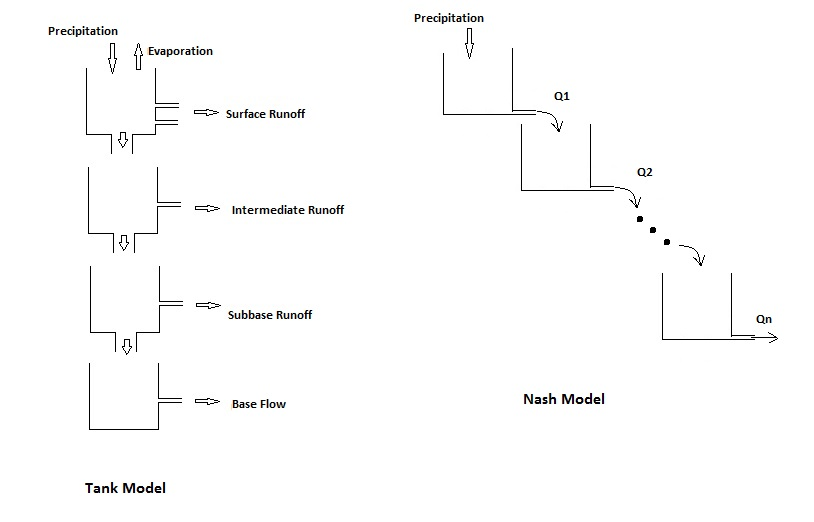
The Nash Model uses a cascade of linear reservoirs to predict streamflow.

Conceptual models represent hydrologic systems using physical concepts. The conceptual model is used as the starting point for defining the important model components. The relationships between model components are then specified using algebraic equations, ordinary or partial differential equations, or integral equations. The model is then solved using analytical or numerical procedures.

Conceptual models are commonly used to represent the important components (e.g., features, events, and processes) that relate hydrologic inputs to outputs. These components describe the important functions of the system of interest, and are often constructed using entities (stores of water) and relationships between these entitites (flows or fluxes between stores). The conceptual model is coupled with scenarios to describe specific events (either input or outcome scenarios).

For example, a watershed model could be represented using tributaries as boxes with arrows pointing toward a box that represents the main river. The conceptual model would then specify the important watershed features (e.g., land use, land cover, soils, subsoils, geology, wetlands, lakes), atmospheric exchanges (e.g., precipitation, evapotranspiration), human uses (e.g., agricultural, municipal, industrial, navigation, thermo- and hydro-electric power generation), flow processes (e.g., overland, interflow, baseflow, channel flow), transport processes (e.g., sediments, nutrients, pathogens), and events (e.g., low-, flood-, and mean-flow conditions).

Model scope and complexity is dependent on modeling objectives, with greater detail required if human or environmental systems are subject to greater risk. Systems modeling can be used for building conceptual models that are then populated using mathematical relationships.

Example 1

The linear-reservoir model (or Nash model) is widely used for rainfall-runoff analysis. The model uses a cascade of linear reservoirs along with a constant first-order storage coefficient, K, to predict the outflow from each reservoir (which is then used as the input to the next in the series).

The model combines continuity and storage-discharge equations, which yields an ordinary differential equation that describes outflow from each reservoir. The continuity equation for tank models is:

$${dS(t) \over dt} = i(t) - q(t)$$

which indicates that the change in storage over time is the difference between inflows and outflows. The storage-discharge relationship is:

$$q(t) = S(t)/K$$

where K is a constant that indicates how quickly the reservoir drains; a smaller value indicates more rapid outflow. Combining these two equation yields

$$K {dq \over dt} = i - q$$

and has the solution:

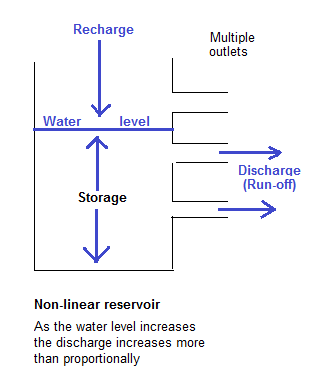
A non-linear reservoir used in rainfall-runoff modelling

$$q= i(1-e^{-t/k})$$

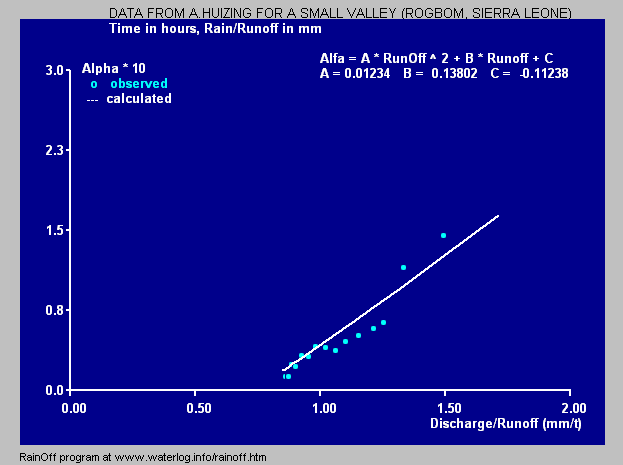
The reaction factor Alpha increases with increasing discharge.

Example 2

Instead of using a series of linear reservoirs, also the model of a non-linear reservoir can be used.

In such a model the constant K in the above equation, that may also be called reaction factor, needs to be replaced by another symbol, say α (Alpha), to indicate the dependence of this factor on storage (S) and discharge (q).

In the left figure the relation is quadratic:

α = 0.0123 q^{2} + 0.138 q - 0.112

=== Governing equations ===
Governing equations are used to mathematically define the behavior of the system. Algebraic equations are likely often used for simple systems, while ordinary and partial differential equations are often used for problems that change in space in time. Examples of governing equations include:

Manning's equation is an algebraic equation that predicts stream velocity as a function of channel roughness, the hydraulic radius, and the channel slope:

$$v = {k \over n} R^{2/3} S^{1/2}$$

Darcy's law describes steady, one-dimensional groundwater flow using the hydraulic conductivity and the hydraulic gradient:

$$\vec q = -K \nabla h$$

Groundwater flow equation describes time-varying, multidimensional groundwater flow using the aquifer transmissivity and storativity:

$$T \nabla^2 h = S {\partial h \over \partial t}$$

Advection-Dispersion equation describes solute movement in steady, one-dimensional flow using the solute dispersion coefficient and the groundwater velocity:

$$D {\partial^2 C \over\partial x^2} - v {\partial C \over\partial x} = {\partial C \over\partial t}$$

Poiseuille's law describes laminar, steady, one-dimensional fluid flow using the shear stress:

$${\partial P \over \partial x} = - \mu {\partial \tau \over \partial y}$$

Cauchy's integral is an integral method for solving boundary value problems:

$$f(a) = \frac{1}{2\pi i} \oint_\gamma \frac{f(z)}{z-a}\, dz$$

=== Solution algorithms ===
==== Analytic methods ====
Exact solutions for algebraic, differential, and integral equations can often be found using specified boundary conditions and simplifying assumptions. Laplace and Fourier transform methods are widely used to find analytic solutions to differential and integral equations.

==== Numeric methods ====
Many real-world mathematical models are too complex to meet the simplifying assumptions required for an analytic solution. In these cases, the modeler develops a numerical solution that approximates the exact solution. Solution techniques include the finite-difference and finite-element methods, among many others.

Specialized software may also be used to solve sets of equations using a graphical user interface and complex code, such that the solutions are obtained relatively rapidly and the program may be operated by a layperson or an end user without a deep knowledge of the system. There are model software packages for hundreds of hydrologic purposes, such as surface water flow, nutrient transport and fate, and groundwater flow.

Commonly used numerical models include SWAT, MODFLOW, FEFLOW, PORFLOW, MIKE SHE, CREST, and WEAP.

=== Model calibration and evaluation ===
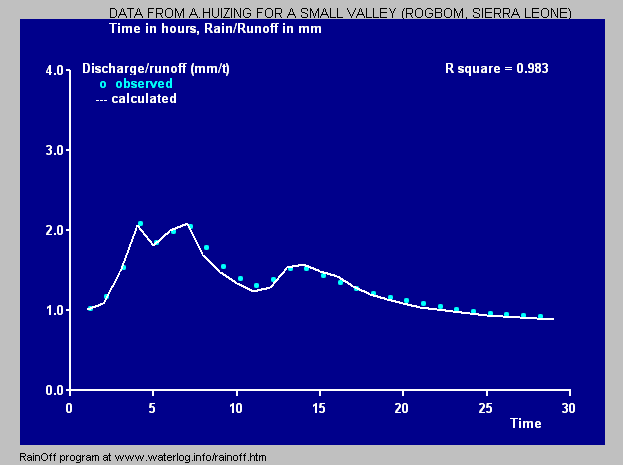
Observed and modelled runoff using the non-linear reservoir model.

Physical models use parameters to characterize the unique aspects of the system being studied. These parameters can be obtained using laboratory and field studies, or estimated by finding the best correspondence between observed and modelled behavior. Between neighbouring catchments which have physical and hydrological similarities, the model parameters varies smoothly suggesting the spatial transferability of parameters.

Model evaluation is used to determine the ability of the calibrated model to meet the needs of the modeler. A commonly used measure of hydrologic model fit is the Nash-Sutcliffe efficiency coefficient.

== See also ==
- Hydrological optimization
- Scientific modelling
- Soil and Water Assessment Tool
