= Outline of hydrology =

Overview of and topical guide to hydrology

The following outline is provided as an overview of and topical guide to hydrology:

Hydrology – study of the movement, distribution, and quality of water on Earth and other planets, including the hydrologic cycle, water resources and environmental watershed sustainability.

== What type of thing is hydrology? ==
Hydrology can be described as all of the following:

- a branch of science
  - a branch of natural science
    - a branch of physical science
      - a branch of Earth science
  - a branch of geography
    - a branch of physical geography

=== Essence of hydrology ===
- Water
- Hydrologic cycle
- Cryosphere
- Origin of water on Earth
- Water distribution on Earth

== Branches of hydrology ==
- Hydrometry – the measurement of the different components of the hydrologic cycle
- Chemical hydrology – the study of the chemical characteristics of water
- Ecohydrology – the study of interactions between organisms and the hydrologic cycle
- Hydrogeology – the study of the presence and movement of water in aquifers
- Hydroinformatics – the adaptation of information technology to hydrology and water resources applications
- Hydrometeorology – the study of the transfer of water and energy between land and water body surfaces and the lower atmosphere
- Isotope hydrology – the study of the isotopic signatures of water
- Surface hydrology – the study of hydrologic processes that operate at or near the Earth's surface
- Catchment hydrology – study of the governing processes in a given hydrologically defined catchment
- Drainage basin management – covers water-storage, in the form of reservoirs, and flood-protection.
- Water quality – includes the chemistry of water in rivers and lakes, both of pollutants and natural solutes.

== History of hydrology ==
History of hydrology

== Things studied by hydrology ==
=== Abstract concepts in hydrology ===
- Field capacity

=== Phenomena studied by hydrology ===
==== Water movement pathways ====
Water cycle (aka "hydrological cycle")

- Above ground
  - Evaporation –
    - Pan evaporation –
  - Condensation –
  - Precipitation – condensed water, is pulled by gravity back to Earth, in the form of:
    - Drizzle
    - Rain
    - Sleet
    - Snow
    - Graupel
    - Hail
  - Interception –
    - Evapotranspiration –
  - Stemflow –
  - Throughfall –
- On ground
  - Surface runoff – flow of surface water
    - First flush
    - Floods
      - Flash floods
  - Overland flow –
  - Horton overland flow –
- Below ground
  - Infiltration –
  - Pipeflow –
  - Baseflow –
  - Subsurface flow – flow of ground water

=== Physical things studied by hydrology ===
- Ground water
- Soil moisture
- Surface water

=== Environmental issues ===
- Desertification/Oasification –
- Hypoxia –
- Erosion –
- Water pollution –

== Measurement tools ==
=== Groundwater ===
- Aquifer characterization

- Flow direction

- Piezometer - groundwater pressure and, by inference, groundwater depth (see: aquifer test)
- Conductivity, storativity, transmisivity
- Geophysical methods

- Vadose zone characterization
  - Infiltration
    - Infiltrometer - infiltration
  - Soil moisture
    - Capacitance probe-soil moisture
    - Time domain reflectometer - soil moisture
    - Tensiometer - soil moisture
    - Solute sampling
    - Geophysical methods

=== Surface water ===
- Water level

- Mechanical pressure gauge –
- Electronic pressure gauge –
- Acoustic pressure gauge –

- Channel shape

- Dumpy level –

- Discharge

- Acoustic Doppler velocimeter –
- Dilution tracing –

=== Meteorological ===
- Precipitation

- Rain gauge – rainfall depth (unit) and intensity (unit time^{−1})
- Disdrometer – raindrop size, total precipitation depth and intensity
- Doppler weather radar – raindrop size, total precipitation depth and intensity, rain cloud reflectivity converted to precipitation intensity through calibration to rain gauges
- Wind profiler – precipitation vertical and horizontal motion, vertical cross-section of reflectivity and typing

- Frozen precipitation (on ground)

- Pressure sensors – pressure, depth, and liquid water equivalent
- Acoustic sensors – pressure, depth, and liquid water equivalent

- Mean windspeed and direction

- Anemometer –
- Doppler sonar –
- Wind profiler – air vertical and horizontal motion

- Mean air temperature

- Thermometer –

- Humidity

- Infrared thermometer – a form of remote sensing
- Hygrometer (Psychrometer) – measures relative humidity

- Air pressure

- Barometer –

- Heat flux

- Net radiometer –
- Pyranometer –
- Pyrgeometer –
- Heat flux sensor –
- Lysimeter –

- Cloudiness/Sunshine

- Spectroradiometer –
- Campbell–Stokes recorder –

- Evapotranspiration

- Water budget method

- Basin water balance –
- Evaporation pan –
- Lysimetry –
- Soil moisture depletion –

- Water vapor transfer method

- Bowen ratio – considers the energy budget
- Eddy covariance –

- Component analysis

- Porometry/Sap flow –
- Interception loss –
- Soil evaporation –

- Large-scale

- Scintillometer –
- Remote sensing estimates –
- LIDAR –

=== Soil/porous media ===
- Bulk density & porosity

- Oven dried sample –

- Matric potential

- Suction plate – determines relationship between the water volume and matric potential
- Resistance thermometer – relates to matric potential from previous calibration

- Hydraulic conductivity

- Disc permeameter – measures soil hydraulic conductivity
- Rainfall simulator – measures output through the application of constant input ("rain") in a sealed area
- Slug test – addition or removal of water and monitors the time until return to predisturbance level

- Piezometer –
- Soil moisture content (water volume percentage)

- Frequency domain sensor –
- Time domain reflectometer –
- Neutron probe –

=== Water quality ===
- Conductivity

- Electrical conductivity – variety of probes used

- pH

- pH meter –

- Dissolved oxygen (DO)

- Winkler test –

- Turbidity

- Nephelometer (Turbidimeter) –

- Water clarity

- Secchi disk –

- Bed load
- Erosion/deposition

== Modeling ==
- Behavioral modeling in hydrology

=== Equations ===
Basin

- Hack's law –

Catchment

- Water balance –

Evaporation

- Penman –
- Penman-Monteith –

Infiltration/Soil Movement

- Darcy's law –

- Darcy-Weisbach –

- Richards equation –

Streamflow/Open channel

- Fick's law of diffusion –
- Chézy formula –
- Manning formula –
- Strahler number –
- Standard step method – computational technique for modeling steady state open channel surface profiles

Erosion

- Hjulström curve –

Groundwater

- Dupuit–Forchheimer assumption –
- Groundwater flow equation –

=== Power/Uncertainty ===
- Nash–Sutcliffe model efficiency coefficient
- GLUE

==== Models ====
Hydrological transport model

- Canadian Land Surface Scheme
- CHyM – Cetemps Hydrological Model
- DRAINMOD
- DSSAM
- FEHM
- Flood Modeller Pro
- Groundwater model
- GSSHA
- HBV hydrology model
- HEC-HMS
- HydroGeoSphere
- Hydrologic evaluation of landfill performance
- Hydrological transport model
- Isochrone map
- Litpack
- METRIC
- MIKE 11
- MODFLOW
- Mouse
- RheinBlick2050
- Runoff model (reservoir)
- SahysMod
- SaltMod
- SEDCAD
- SHETRAN
- Stochastic Empirical Loading and Dilution Model
- SWAT model
- Temporal Analyst
- Vflo
- WAFLEX
- WaterGAP
- WEAP
- ZOOMQ3D

== Applications of hydrology ==
Some examples of applications of hydrology:

- Analyzing the impacts of antecedent moisture on sanitary sewer systems
- Assessing contaminant transport risk and establishing environmental policy guidelines
- Assessing the impacts of natural and anthropogenic environmental change on water resources
- Designing bridges
- Designing dams for water supply or hydroelectric power generation
- Designing irrigation schemes and managing agricultural productivity
- Designing riparian restoration projects
- Designing sewers and urban drainage system
- Determining the agricultural water balance
- Determining the water balance of a region
- Fog collection
- Part of the hazard module in catastrophe modeling
- Predicting and mitigating flood, landslide and drought risk
- Predicting geomorphologic changes, such as erosion or sedimentation
- Providing drinking water
- Real-time flood forecasting and flood warning

== Hydrology organizations ==
=== Intergovernmental organizations ===
- International Hydrological Programme (IHP)

=== International research bodies ===
- International Water Management Institute (IWMI)
- UNESCO-IHE Institute for Water Education

=== National research bodies ===
- Centre for Ecology and Hydrology – UK
- Centre for Water Science, Cranfield University, UK
- eawag – aquatic research, ETH Zürich, Switzerland
- Institute of Hydrology, Albert-Ludwigs-University of Freiburg, Germany
- United States Geological Survey – Water Resources of the United States
- NOAA's National Weather Service – Office of Hydrologic Development, USA
- US Army Corps of Engineers Hydrologic Engineering Center, USA
- Hydrologic Research Center, USA
- NOAA Economics and Social Sciences, USA
- University of Oklahoma Center for Natural Hazards and Disasters Research, USA
- National Hydrology Research Centre, Canada
- National Institute of Hydrology, India

=== National and international societies ===
- Geological Society of America (GSA) – Hydrogeology Division
- American Geophysical Union (AGU) – Hydrology Section
- National Ground Water Association (NGWA)
- American Water Resources Association
- Consortium of Universities for the Advancement of Hydrologic Science, Inc. (CUAHSI)
- International Association of Hydrological Sciences (IAHS)
- Statistics in Hydrology Working Group (subgroup of IAHS)
- German Hydrological Society (DHG: Deutsche Hydrologische Gesellschaft)
- Italian Hydrological Society (SII-IHS) – http://www.sii-ihs.it
- Nordic Association for Hydrology
- British Hydrological Society
- Russian Geographical Society (Moscow Center) – Hydrology Commission
- International Association for Environmental Hydrology
- International Association of Hydrogeologists

=== Basin- and catchment-wide overviews ===
- Connected Waters Initiative, University of New South Wales – Investigating and raising awareness of groundwater and water resource issues in Australia
- Murray Darling Basin Initiative, Department of Environment and Heritage, Australia

== Hydrology publications ==
=== Hydrology-related journals ===
- Hydrological Processes, ISSN 1099-1085 (electronic) 0885-6087 (paper), John Wiley & Sons
- Hydrology Research, ISSN 0029-1277, IWA Publishing (formerly Nordic Hydrology)
- Journal of Hydroinformatics, ISSN 1464-7141, IWA Publishing
- Journal of Hydrologic Engineering, ISSN 0733-9496, ASCE Publication
- Journal of Hydrology
- Water Research
- Water Resources Research
- Hydrological Sciences Journal – Journal of the International Association of Hydrological Sciences (IAHS) ISSN 0262-6667 (Print), ISSN 2150-3435 (Online)

== Persons influential in the field of hydrology ==
- Hein de Baar
- Günter Blöschl
- Chen Xing (hydrologist)
- Ven Te Chow
- Gedeon Dagan
- James Dooge
- Endre Dudich
- G. H. Dury
- Saeid Eslamian
- Philipp Forchheimer
- François-Alphonse Forel
- Pieter Harting
- Majid Hassanizadeh
- Alf Howard
- Jan Vladimír Hráský
- Hydra (skater)
- Shahbaz Khan (hydrologist)
- Vit Klemes
- Michal Kravčík
- Torben Larsen
- John R. Philip
- Giovanni Roncagli
- Arturo Sanchez-Azofeifa
- Alireza Shokoohi
- Bojidar Spiriev
- Valeryan Uryvaev
- Jasper A. Vrugt
- John Williams (water scientist)
- Czesław Zakaszewski

== Allied sciences ==
- Aquatic chemistry –
- Civil engineering –

- Hydraulic engineering –

- Climatology –
- Environmental engineering –
- Environmental Engineering Science –
- Geomorphology –
- Hydroacoustics –
- Hydrography –

- Limnology –
- Oceanography –

- Physical geography –

== Hydrology lists ==
- Drainage basins by area – largest hydrologically defined watersheds in the world
- Floods – chronological and geographic list of major floods worldwide
- Waterways – worldwide listing of waterbodies classified as rivers, canals, estuaries, and firths

== See also ==
- Outline of meteorology

Other water-related fields

- Oceanography – more general study of water in the oceans and estuaries.
- Meteorology – more general study of the atmosphere and of weather, including precipitation as snow and rainfall.
- Limnology – study of inland waters (running and standing waters, both fresh and saline, natural or man-made), including their biological, chemical, physical, geological, and other attributes. This includes the study of lakes and ponds, rivers, springs, streams and wetlands.
- Water resources – sources of water that are useful or potentially useful. Hydrology studies the availability of those resources, but usually not their uses.
