= Canopy interception =

Rainfall intercepted by the canopy of a tree

Animation of the management of stormwater through tree planting

Canopy interception is the rainfall that is intercepted by the canopy of a tree and successively evaporates from the leaves. Precipitation that is not intercepted will fall as throughfall or stemflow on the forest floor.

Many methods exist to measure canopy interception. The most often used method is by measuring rainfall above the canopy and subtract throughfall and stem flow). However, the problem with this method is that the canopy is not homogeneous, which causes difficulty in obtaining representative throughfall data.

A method employed to avoid this problem is covering forest floor with plastic sheets and collecting the throughfall. The disadvantage of this method is that it is not suitable for long periods, because in the end the trees will dry from water shortage, and the method is also not applicable for snow events.

The method by Hancock and Crowther avoided these problems by making use of the cantilever effect of branches. If leaves on a branch hold water, it becomes more heavy and will bend. By measuring the displacement, it is possible to determine the amount of intercepted water. This method was refined in 2005 by making use of strain gauges. However, the disadvantages of these methods are that only information about one single branch is obtained and it would be quite laborious to measure an entire tree or forest.

== See also ==
- Interception (water)
- Forest floor interception
