= Hydrus (software) =

Hydrologic simulation software suite

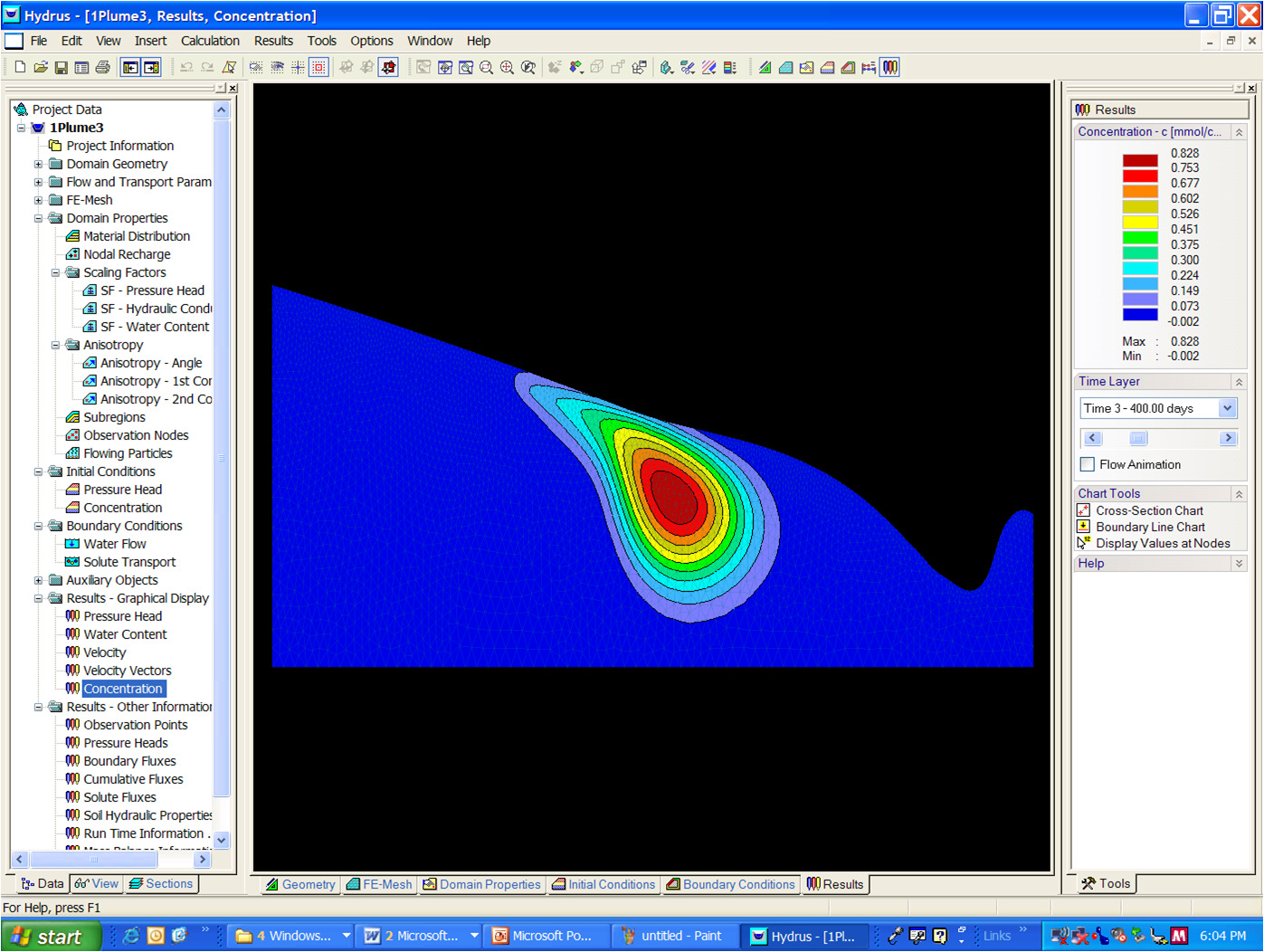
- Developer: PC Progress
- Stable release: 3.02
- Operating system: Windows 10, Windows 8, Windows 7, Windows Vista, Windows XP
- Type: Hydrological modelling
- License: Public domain software (Hydrus-1D); Proprietary (HYDRUS 2D/3D)
- Website: http://www.pc-progress.com/en/default.aspx?hydrus-3d

Hydrus is a suite of Windows-based modeling software that can be used for analysis of water flow, heat and solute transport in variably saturated porous media (e.g., soils). HYDRUS suite of software is supported by an interactive graphics-based interface for data-preprocessing, discretization of the soil profile, and graphic presentation of the results. While HYDRUS-1D simulates water flow, solute and heat transport in one-dimension, and is a public domain software, HYDRUS 2D/3D extends the simulation capabilities to the second and third dimensions, and is distributed commercially.

== History ==
=== HYDRUS 1D ===
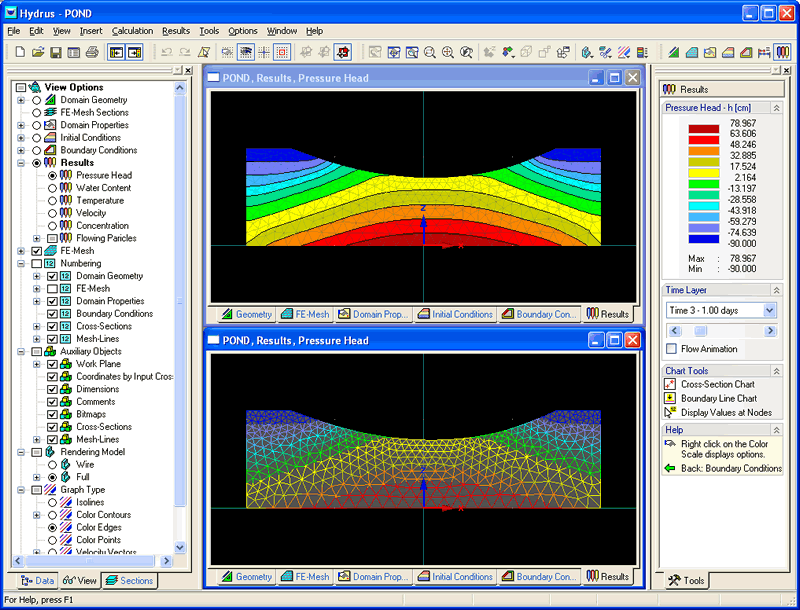

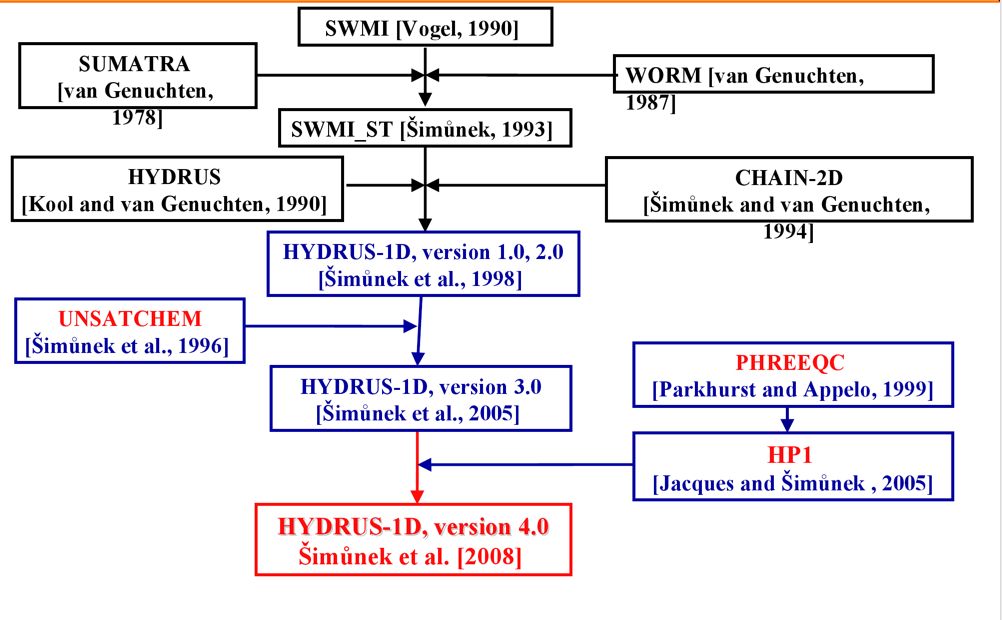
History of Hydrus-1D Development

HYDRUS-1D traces its roots to the early work of van Genuchten and his SUMATRA and WORM models, as well as later work by Vogel (1987) and Kool and van Genuchten (1989) and their SWMI and HYDRUS models, respectively. While Hermitian cubic finite element numerical schemes were used in SUMATRA and linear finite elements in WORM and the older HYDRUS code for solution of both the water flow and solute transport equations, SWMI used finite differences to solve the flow equation.

Various features of these four early models were combined first in the MS-DOS-based SWMI_ST model (Šimůnek et al., 1993), and later in the Windows-based HYDRUS-1D simulator (Šimůnek et al., 1998). After releasing versions 1 (for 16-bit Windows 3.1) and 2 (for 32-bit Windows 95), the next two major updates (versions 3 and 4) were released in 2005 and 2008. These last two versions included additional modules applicable to more complex biogeochemical reactions than the standard HYDRUS modules.

While the standard modules of HYDRUS-1D can simulate the transport of solutes that are either fully independent or involved in the sequential first-order degradation chains, the two new modules can consider mutual interactions between multiple solutes, such as cation exchange and precipitation/dissolution.

Version 3 included the UNSATCHEM module (Suarez and Šimůnek, 1997) for simulating carbon dioxide transport as well as the multi-component transport of major ions. The UNSATCHEM major ion module was recently included also in version 2 of HYDRUS (2D/3D) (Šimůnek et al., 2011). Version 4 of HYDRUS-1D includes now not only the UNSATCHEM module, but also the HP1 program (Jacques and Šimůnek, 2005), which resulted from coupling HYDRUS-1D with the biogeochemical program PHREEQC.

=== HYDRUS 2D/3D ===
The current HYDRUS (2D/3D) suite of software and their predecessors have a long history. The origin of these models can be traced back to the early work of Dr. Shlomo Neuman and collaborators (e.g., Neuman, 1972) who developed their UNSAT model at the Hydraulic Engineering Laboratory of Technion – Israel Institute of Technology, in Haifa, Israel, long before the introduction of personal computers. UNSAT was a finite element model simulating water flow in two-dimensional variably-saturated domains as described with the Richards equation. The model additionally considered root water uptake as well as a range of pertinent boundary conditions required to ensure wide applicability of the model. UNSAT was later modified by Davis and Neuman (1983) at the University of Arizona, Tucson, such that the model could be run on personal computers.

This last version of UNSAT formed the basis of the SWMII model developed by Vogel (1987) during his stay at Wageningen University, the Netherlands. SWMII significantly extended the capabilities and ease of use of UNSAT. The code simulated variably-saturated water flow in two-dimensional transport domains, implemented the van Genuchten soil hydraulic functions (van Genuchten, 1980) and modifications thereof, considered root water uptake by taking advantage of some of the features of the SWATRE model (Feddes et al., 1978), and included scaling factors to enable simulations of flow in heterogeneous soils. The code also allowed the flow region to be composed of nonuniform soils having an arbitrary degree of local anisotropy. SWMII was a direct predecessor of the SWMS_2D model (Šimůnek et al., 1992) developed later at US Salinity Laboratory.

The SWMS_2D model (Šimůnek et al., 1992) considerably extended the capabilities of SWMII by including provisions for solute transport. Solute transport was described using the standard advection-dispersion equation that included linear sorption, first-order degradation in both the liquid and solid phases, and zero-order production in both phases. Several other numerical improvements were at the time also implemented in SWMS_2D. These included solution of the mixed form of the Richards equation as suggested by Celia et al. (1990), thus providing excellent mass balances in the water flow calculations. While SWMII could simulate water flow in either two-dimensional vertical or horizontal planes, SWMS_2D extended the range of applications also to three-dimensional axisymmetrical flow domains around a vertical axis of symmetry. Examples are flow to a well, infiltration from a surface ring or tension disc infiltrometer, and infiltration from a surface or subsurface dripper.

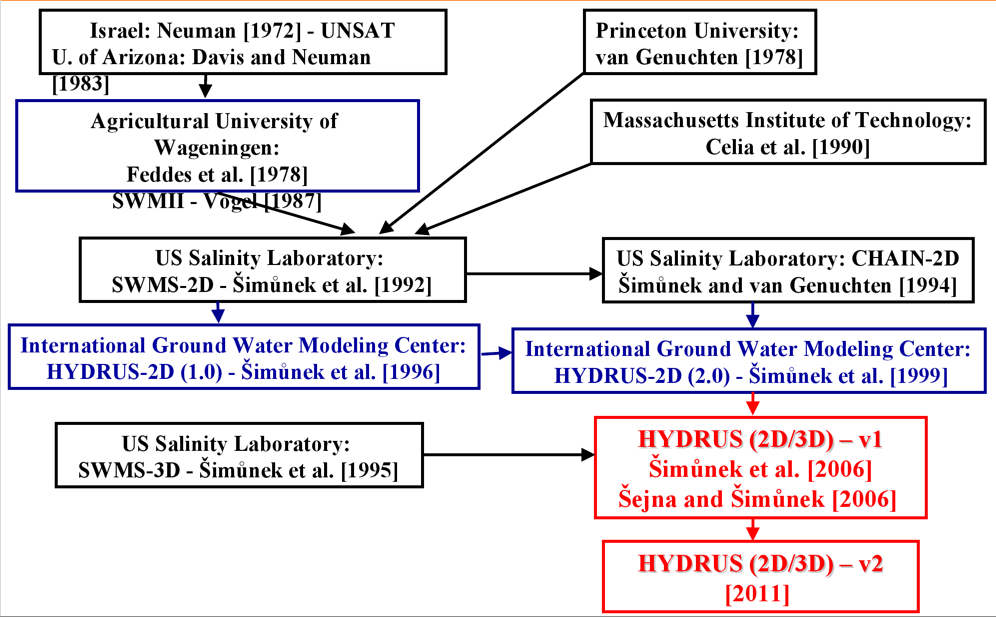
History of HYDRUS 2D/3D Development

The first major upgrade of SWMS_2D was released under the name CHAIN_2D (Šimůnek et al., 1994b). This model greatly expanded upon the capabilities of SWMS_2D by including, among other things, sequential first-order solute decay chains and heat transport. The temperature dependence of the soil hydraulic properties was included by considering the effects of temperature on surface tension, dynamic viscosity and the density of water. The heat transport equation in CHAIN_2D considered transport due to conduction and advection with flowing water. The solute transport equations considered advective-dispersive transport in the liquid phase, as well as diffusion in the gaseous phase. The transport equations also included provisions for nonlinear nonequilibrium reactions between the solid and liquid phases, linear equilibrium reactions between the liquid and gaseous phase, zero-order production and two first-order degradation reactions: one which was independent of other solutes, and one which provided the coupling between solutes involved in the sequential first-order decay reactions.

The SWMS_2D and CHAIN_2D models formed the bases of versions 1.0 (for 16-bit Windows 3.1) and 2.0 (for 32-bit Windows 95) of HYDRUS-2D (Šimůnek et al., 1999). A unique feature of HYDRUS-2D was that it used a Microsoft Windows-based graphical user interface (GUI) to manage the input data required to run the program, as well as for nodal discretization and editing, parameter allocation, problem execution, and visualization of results. It could handle flow regions delineated by irregular boundaries, as well as three-dimensional regions exhibiting radial symmetry about the vertical axis. The code includes the MeshGen2D mesh generator, which was specifically designed for variably-saturated subsurface flow and transport problems. The mesh generator may be used for defining very general domain geometries, and for discretizing the transport domain into an unstructured finite element mesh. HYDRUS-2D has been recently fully replaced with HYDRUS (2D/3D) as described below.

The HYDRUS (2D/3D) (version 1) software package (Šimůnek et al., 2006; Šejna and Šimůnek, 2007) is an extension and replacement of HYDRUS-2D (version 2.0) and SWMS_3D (Šimůnek et al., 1995). This software package is a complete rewrite of HYDRUS-2D and its extensions for two- and three-dimensional geometries. In addition to features and processes available in HYDRUS-2D and SWMS_3D, the new computational modules of HYDRUS (2D/3D) consider (a) water flow and solute transport in a dual-porosity system, thus allowing for preferential flow in fractures or macropores while storing water in the matrix, (b) root water uptake with compensation, (c) the spatial root distribution functions, (d) the soil hydraulic property models of Kosugi and Durner, (e) the transport of viruses, colloids, and/or bacteria using an attachment/detachment model, filtration theory, and blocking functions, (f) a constructed wetland module (only in 2D), (g) the new hysteresis model to eliminate pumping by keeping track of historical reversal points, and many other options.

== Simulated processes ==
Both HYDRUS models may be used to simulate movement of water, heat, and multiple solutes in variably saturated media. Both programs use linear finite elements to numerically solve the Richards equation for saturated-unsaturated water flow and Fickian-based advection dispersion equations for both heat and solute transport. The flow equation also includes a sink term to account for water uptake by plant roots as a function of both water and salinity stress. The unsaturated soil hydraulic properties can be described using van Genuchten, Brooks and Corey, modified van Genuchten, Kosugi, and Durner type analytical functions. The heat transport equation considers conduction as well as advection with flowing water. The solute transport equations assume advective-dispersive transport in the liquid phase, and diffusion in the gaseous phase. The transport equations further include provisions for nonlinear and/or non-equilibrium reactions between the solid and liquid phases, linear equilibrium reactions between the liquid and gaseous phases, zero-order production, and two first-order degradation reactions: one which is independent of other solutes, and one which provides the coupling between solutes involved in sequential first order decay reactions. In addition, physical non-equilibrium solute transport can be accounted for by assuming a two-region, dual-porosity type formulation which partitions the liquid phase into mobile and immobile regions.

HYDRUS models may be used to analyze water and solute movement in unsaturated, partially saturated, or fully saturated homogeneous of layered media. The codes incorporates hysteresis by assuming that drying scanning curves are scaled from the main drying curve, and wetting scanning curves from the main wetting curve. Root water uptake can be simulated as a function of both water and salinity stress, and can be either compensated or uncompensated. The HYDRUS software packages additionally implement a Marquardt–Levenberg type parameter estimation technique for inverse estimation of soil hydraulic and/or solute transport and reaction parameters from measured transient or steady-state flow and/or transport data. The programs are for this purpose written in such a way that almost any application that can be run in a direct mode can equally well be run in an inverse mode, and thus for model calibration and parameter estimation.

The HYDRUS packages use a Microsoft Windows-based graphical user interface (GUI) to manage the input data required to run the program, as well as for nodal discretization and editing, parameter allocation, problem execution, and visualization of results. All spatially distributed parameters, such as those for various soil horizons, the root water uptake distribution, and the initial conditions for water, heat and solute movement, are specified in a graphical environment. The program offers graphs of the distributions of the pressure head, water content, water and solute fluxes, root water uptake, temperature and solute concentrations in the subsurface at pre-selected times. Also included is a small catalog of unsaturated soil hydraulic properties, as well as pedotransfer functions based on neural networks.

Both HYDRUS models also consider various provisions for simulating non-equilibrium flow and transport. The flow equation for the latter purpose can consider dual-porosity-type flow with a fraction of the water content being mobile, and a fraction immobile. The transport equations additionally were modified to allow consideration of kinetic attachment/detachment processes of solutes to the solid phase, and hence of solutes having a finite size. This attachment/detachment feature has been used by many recently to simulate the transport of viruses, colloids, and bacteria.

HYDRUS model further include modules for simulating carbon dioxide transport (only HYDRUS-1D) and major ion chemistry modules, adopted from the UNSATCHEM program. HYDRUS-1D can thus be used in applications evaluating overall salinity, the concentration of individual soluble cations, as well as of the Sodium Adsorption Ratio and the Exchangeable Sodium Percentage.

== Applications ==
Both HYDRUS-1D and HYDRUS (2D/3D) has been used in hundreds, if not thousands of applications referenced in peer-reviewed journal articles and many technical reports. Both software packages are also used in classrooms of many universities in courses covering Soil Physics, Processes in the Vadose Zone, or Vadose Zone Hydrology. A selected list of hundreds of applications of both HYDRUS software packages are given at:

http://www.pc-progress.com/en/Default.aspx?h3d-references

http://www.pc-progress.com/en/Default.aspx?h1d-references

The website also provides many specific applications in the libraries of HYDRUS projects at:

http://www.pc-progress.com/en/Default.aspx?h1d-library

http://www.pc-progress.com/en/Default.aspx?h3d-applications

HYDRUS software also provides capabilities for simulating water flow and solute transport for specialized domains.

=== Constructed Wetland Module ===
Constructed wetlands (CWs) are engineered water treatment systems that optimize the treatment processes found in natural environments. CWs are popular systems which efficiently treat various types of polluted water and are therefore sustainable, environmentally friendly solutions. A large number of physical, chemical and biological processes are simultaneously active and mutually influence each other. HYDRUS offers two biokinetic model formulations: (a) the CW2D module (Langergraber and Šimůnek, 2005), and/or the CW M1 (Constructed Wetland Model #1) biokinetic model (Langergraber et al., 2009b).
