= CHYM =

CHYM may refer to:

- CHYM-FM, a radio station in Kitchener, Ontario
- CHyM - Cetemps Hydrological Model, for modelling drainage, floods etc.
- Chym, part of Perín-Chym, a municipality in Slovakia
