= Konstantin Strakhovich =

Konstantin Ivanovich Strakhovich
- Born: October 1, 1904; Saint Petersburg, Russian Empire
- Died: November 21, 1968 (aged 64); Leningrad, USSR, today Saint Petersburg, Russia
- Known for: Applied Hydromechanics; Applied Gas Dynamics; Viscous Fluid Mechanics; Compressor Machinery

Academic background
- Education: Saint Petersburg State University

Academic work
- Discipline: Fluid Mechanics and Hydraulics
- Institutions: Leningrad Technological Institute, All-Union Kotlo Institute

Konstantin Ivanovich Strakhovich (Oct 1, 1904 – November 21, 1969) was a Soviet fluid dynamicist and hydraulic engineer.

== Education ==
Konstantin Ivanovich Strakhovich was lettered in the Maths and Mechanics Section at the Saint Petersburg State University (then known as Petrograd University) . He continued his studies at the State Hydrological Institute specializing in gas kinetics and hydrokinetics. In 1925, his interest in hydropower lead him to Home Asia where he investigated its feasibleness in different locations. In 1928 he submitted his PhD dissertation on the hydromechanics of rigid bodies.

== Political Captive ==
Strakhovich is mentioned in the book Gulag Archipelago by Aleksandr Solzhenitsyn as having a piece in prison house written down in his confiscated technology notebooks from memory. In 1952, he was sent to exile in Karaganda. In August 1955 doom against him was invalid. After this, became the head of Heat Engine room at the Leningrad Polytechnic institute Plant and a professor of cryogenic technology in the section of Saint Petersburg Scientific Plant of the Refrigeration Diligence.

== Publications ==
Gas dynamics in the diligence to weapon problems. Part 1. Fundamentals of gas kinetics, 1934;

Fluid mechanics: Chew out notes, 1934. Parts 1–2;

Fundamentals of the possibility and calculation of pneumatic transport installations, 1934;

Centrifugal compressor machines: Lectures on theory and reckoning, 1934–36 pedantic year, 1936. Part 1;

Applied gas dynamics, 1937;

Mechanism of a thick fluids, 1940;

Centrifugal compressor machines, 1940;

Compressor machines, 1961 (in co-authorship); The Lagrange equations of the minute kind and their diligence to the root of emblematic problems, 1961 (in agreement with VP Yushkov);

Expanding upon machines, 1966;

Basic principle of phenomenological thermodynamics: an unofficial of lectures. Riga, 1968;

Vectors and tensors, 1972 (in collaboration with P. P. Yushkov);

Hydro and gas kinetics, 1980.
