= Igor A. Shiklomanov =

Russian hydrologist

Igor Alekseyevich Shiklomanov (Russian: Игорь Алексеевич Шикломанов; February 28, 1939, Tver Oblast – August 22, 2010, St. Petersburg) was a Russian hydrologist, Doctor of Sciences, Professor, Director of the Russian State Hydrological Institute from 1981, Academician of the Russian Academy of Natural Sciences (since 2001), Honored Scientist of the Russian Federation (1999), Laureate of the 2001 International Hydrology Prize and winner of the 2006 Tyler Prize for Environmental Achievement.

He graduated from the Russian State Hydrometeorological University in 1961. In 1967, he defended his Candidate's Dissertation. He was a student of Professor Daniil Sokolovsky. In 1977, he defended his doctoral dissertation.

I.A.Shiklomanov is the author more than 220 scientific papers including 11 monographs.
