= Forest floor interception =

Forest floor interception is the part of the (net) precipitation or throughfall that is temporarily stored in the top layer of the forest floor and successively evaporated within a few hours or days during and after the rainfall event. The forest floor can consist of bare soil, short vegetation (like grasses, mosses, creeping vegetation, etc.) or litter (i.e. leaves, twigs, or small branches). This throughfall is especially rich in nutrients which makes its redistribution into the soil is an important factor for the ecology and water demand of surrounding vegetation. As a hydrological process it is crucial for water resource management and climate change.

== Influencing Factors ==
=== Vegetation Characteristics ===
There are variations in storage capacity based on forest floor types, species of vegetation such as needles and leaves have different capacities. The thickness of the layer of vegetation can be a contributing factor as thicker layers have a greater capacity for storing water.

There is an observable seasonal response throughout the year. In Fall, leaf fall accumulates on the forest floor to increase the thickness that then slowly decomposes. In the presence of snow, the layer of vegetation is compressed, reducing the storage capacity.

=== Precipitation Characteristics ===
The frequency of throughfall events, whether continuous or at irregular intervals, has a significant impact on water interception. Even if they are of equal throughfall, the latter has intervals of time that allow for partial evaporation creating more available storage. The intensity of throughfall is a crucial factor in storage, as high intensities are consistent with increased storage capacities.

=== Evaporative Demand ===
High potential evaporation expedites the evaporation of intercepted water, two facilitators of evaporation are wind and radiation. Wind is a significant part of moisture removal and tends to remain low at the ground level contributing to a higher vapid deficit. Radiation penetration through the canopy allows more radiation to reach the forest floor in the winter than in the summer, creating variation in seasonal evaporation rates.

== Interception Loss ==
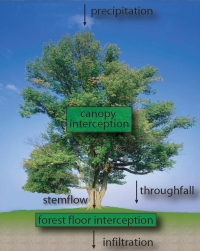
Definition of canopy and forest floor interception

Interception loss is the portion of rainfall intercepted by the canopy and evaporated back into the atmosphere and calculated as the difference of gross rainfall and the net rainfall (sum of throughfall and stemflow) at the ground floor. The overall loss for a vegetation cover relies on the evaporation rate of wet canopy and the duration of the canopy's wetness. Seemingly a minor process, but its frequency can impede the process of rainfall recharging soil moisture and generating runoff ultimately impacting the water balance. This is especially true for forest stands that have an annual interception loss of a quarter or more of the gross rainfall. This can range from 9% in the Amazonia to 60% in Picea sitchensis and Picea abies in Brittany. Tall vegetation experience significant evaporation rates of intercepted water that exceed the transpiration rates as opposed to short vegetation.

== Measurement ==
There is a lack of research on forest floor interception but it is quantifiable by lab or field methods. In lab methods, samples are observed under controlled conditions within a laboratory, however at the risk of disturbing the samples. Field methods are experiments done on-site thus minimizing disturbance of the samples.

Rutter-type models are the more frequent techniques in modeling the interception process. It is depicted by a balance of rainfall input, storage, and output through drainage and evaporation.

== See also ==
- Interception (water)
- Canopy interception
- Stemflow
- Throughfall
- Water cycle
