= RheinBlick2050 =

Regional climate change project

RheinBlick2050 is an environmental science research project on the impacts of regional climate change on discharge of the Rhine River and its major tributaries (here: Moselle and Main rivers) in Central Europe. The project runtime was from January 2008 until September 2010, initiated by and coordinated on behalf of the International Commission for the Hydrology of the Rhine Basin (CHR).

== Motivation ==
Regional climate change may lead to modified hydrometeorological regimes which in turn affect river discharge; depending on the vulnerability and sensitivity of the affected natural or managed systems this has variable impacts (on ecology, economy, infrastructure, transport, energy production, water management, etc.). RheinBlick2050 deals solely with impacts, i.e. physical system changes, not with adaptation or mitigation. One of the RheinBlick2050 project's characteristics is that it provides a joint, concerted, trans-boundary view on discharge changes, with institutions participating in the project consortium from nearly all riparian countries of the Rhine basin. Those various institutions and projects provided expertise, data, methods, software tools and numerical model simulations to a common research framework.

== Data, Methods and Experiment Design ==
The experiment design follows a typical hydrological climate change impact study: In a data-synthesis, multi-model ensemble approach a dedicated greenhouse gas emission scenario (here mainly SRES A1B) is used with various global climate models (GCM) (mainly ECHAM5 and HadCM3), regionalized via a dynamical downscaling using regional climate models (RCM). Based on those readily available datasets, after an extensive model chain evaluation and selection, a correction of systematic biases in the daily air temperature and precipitation outputs of the RCMs is done. These fields are used to finally drive the hydrological models (mainly HBV). The hydrological model simulation results are used to analyze changes (expressed as scenario bandwidths and tendencies) in average discharge, low-flow and high-flow diagnostics for selected gauging stations along the Rhine and its major tributaries (Basel, Maxau, Worms, Kaub, Cologne, Lobith, Raunheim and Trier).

== Project consortium ==
- http://www.cemagref.fr Cemagref (France)
- http://www.deltares.nl Deltares (The Netherlands)
- http://www.bafg.de Federal Institute of Hydrology (BfG) (Germany)
- Federal Office for the Environment (Switzerland)
- http://www.hlnug.de Hessisches Landesamt für Naturschutz, Umwelt und Geologie (HLNUG) (Germany)
- http://www.lippmann.lu Public Research Centre - Gabriel Lippmann (CRP-GL) (G.D. of Luxembourg), project coordination
- http://www.rijkswaterstaat.nl Rijkswaterstaat Centre for Water Management (RWS) (The Netherlands)
- http://www.knmi.nl Royal Netherlands Meteorological Institute (KNMI) (The Netherlands)

(alphabetical order)

== See also ==
- ENSEMBLES project^{[usurped]}
- KLIWAS project
- CCHydro project

== Sources ==
- Hydrology and Water Resources Management, Vol. 52, No. 4, 2008
- Central Commission for the Navigation of the Rhine
- Deltas in Times of Climate Change, Rotterdam 2010 conference, meeting report, page 20
- Workshop „Hydrologische Bedeutung und Rolle des Alpenraums in Zeiten des Klimawandels“, 2010, Berlin
- UNESCO heute online, Deutsche UNESCO-Kommission e.V.
- Informationsdienst Wissenschaft
- Readers Edition
- Rhein-Onliner
