= John R. Philip =

John Robert Philip AO FAA FRS (18 January 1927, Ballarat – 26 June 1999, Amsterdam) was an Australian soil physicist and hydrologist, internationally recognised for his contributions to the understanding of movement of water, energy and gases. While he never performed his own experimental work, he was recognised for his skills in mathematics that could be used to explain physical processes and solve real world problems.

His interests were not limited to Environmental mechanics and things mathematical, but included a keen interest in the arts. He was a published poet and a panellist on the Sulman Prize for Architecture. His poetry appears in anthologies edited by Judith Wright and in The Oxford Book of Australian Verse.

== Education and positions ==
He was a recipient of a Scholarship for Scotch College, Melbourne, where he matriculated at age thirteen. He studied for his Bachelor of Civil Engineering, University of Melbourne (1943–1946).

- Appointed to the CSIR Irrigation Research Station, Griffith.
- CSIRO's Plant Industry in Deniliquin (1951).
- Engineer for the Queensland Water Supply Commission.
- CSIRO Division of Plant Industry.
- Foundation chief of the new Centre for Environmental Mechanics (1971–1992).
- Foundation director of the CSIRO Institute of Physical Sciences (1980–1983).
- Retired 1992.

== Research ==
The major and most recognised area of Philip's research was his work on the theory of infiltration. He derived the theory for one dimensional infiltration and developed equations which described the infiltration on both a short term and long term scale, with the revelation that when ponded infiltration in uniform soils occurs, the flow will approach the saturated hydraulic conductivity:

$$I = S \sqrt{t}\ + A t$$

where S is sorptivity and A is the steady-state infiltration rate.

Other areas of research include:

- Examining heat and mass transfer in soils.
- Philip also considered the importance of relationships between organisms and the environment. This included theories on plant canopies, with particular focus on investigation of crop stomatal or surface resistances. Philip was also responsible for the construction of the Soil plant atmosphere continuum which is used to explain the transfer of water within transpiration paths, a concept which has since been expanded upon.
- Philip also studied advection, the horizontal movement of atmospheric properties e.g. temperature and while his analysis and solutions were not completed, his initial work has been important for development of solutions to problems such as long-term flux assessments.

== Achievements ==
- Fellow of Australian Academy of Science (1967)
- Fellow of the Royal Society of London (1974)
- Fellow of the American Geophysical Union
- Recipient of the Robert E. Horton Medal (1982)
- Member of the All-Union (Russian) Academy of Agricultural Sciences (1991)
- CSIRO Fellow Emeritus (1991)
- Associate of the US National Academy of Engineering (1995)
- Officer of the Order of Australia (1998)
- Jaeger Medal of the Australian Academy of Science (1999)
- Honorary Doctorate: University of Melbourne, the Agricultural University of Athens, the University of Guelph

== Publications ==
Philip, J.R. "Theory of infiltration." (1969). Advances in Hydroscience. v. 5, p. 215–296. According to Philip, this is "...a review which gives a concentrated, connected account of a program of work reported in some 30 papers over the period 1954–1968."
