= Oleg Anisimov =

Russian climate scientist

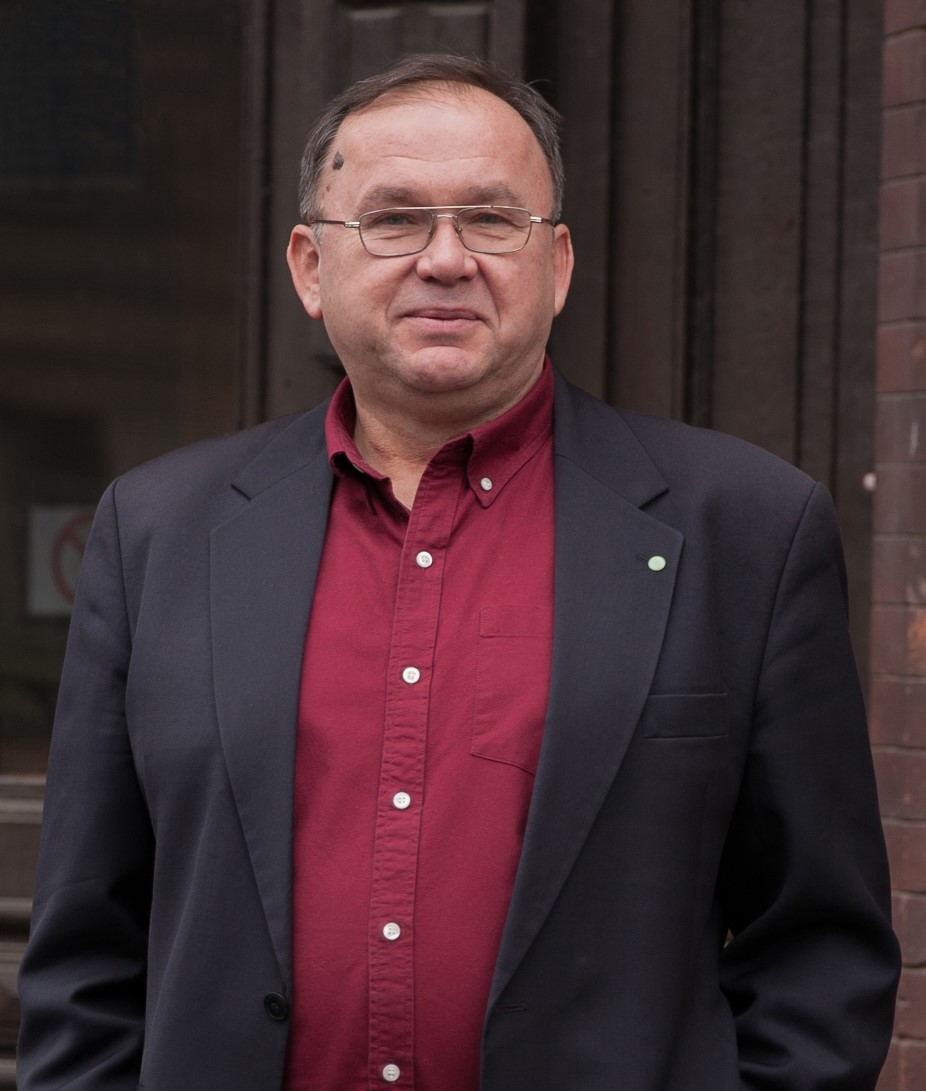

Academic work
- Discipline: physical geography climatology
- Institutions: State Hydrological Institute
- Main interests: impact of climate change on the Arctic region
- Notable works: Polar regions chapters in the Third (2001), Fourth (2007) and Fifth IPCC assessment reports Arctic Climate Impact Assessment; Snow, Water, Ice and Permafrost in the Arctic

Oleg Aleksandrovich Anisimov is a Russian climate scientist. Doctor of Science in Geography and Professor of Physical Geography at the State Hydrological Institute (SHI), part of the Federal Service for Hydrometeorology and Environmental Monitoring of Russia (Roshydromet) in Saint Petersburg. An expert on the impact of climate change on the Arctic region, he has acted as a lead author for the Intergovernmental Panel on Climate Change (IPCC), which received the 2007 Nobel Peace Prize.

== Life ==
Anisimov was the coordinating lead author of the Polar regions chapters in the Third (2001), Fourth (2007) and Fifth IPCC assessment reports. He was also lead author for the Arctic Climate Impact Assessment (ACIA) and Snow, Water, Ice and Permafrost in the Arctic (SWIPA).

In 2015, Anisimov warned that Arctic amplification was causing global warming in Yakutia, Russia's coldest region, to take place at twice the global rate:

There is a reduction in snow and ice cover, which reflect much of the coming sunlight. With less snow and ice, the Arctic gets additional warmth [...] In September 2012 sea ice reached its absolute minimum of 3.2 million square kilometres, which is more than twice lower than the 1979-2000 average of 7.0 million square kilometres. Therefore, by the middle of the century it may be that the Arctic Ocean will be completely ice free.

In December 2018, he addressed the 8th Arctic: Today and the Future, an international forum of Arctic researchers, reporting on changes in the cryolithic zone of the Arctic.

After the 2022 Russian invasion of Ukraine, Anisimov apologised for his country's actions to a virtual meeting of more than 200 delegates from IPCC member countries, saying he had 'huge praise' for Ukraine.
