= Robert E. Horton =

American hydrologist (1875–1945)

Robert Elmer Horton
- Born: May 18, 1875; Parma, Michigan
- Died: April 22, 1945 (aged 69)
- Known for: Hydrology
- Scientific career
- Fields: ecologist

Robert Elmer Horton (May 18, 1875 – April 22, 1945) was an American hydrologist, geomorphologist, civil engineer, and soil scientist, considered by many to be the father of modern American hydrology. An eponymous medal is awarded by the American Geophysical Union (AGU) to recognize outstanding contributions to the field of hydrological geophysics. The AGU Hydrology section (representing about a 3rd of AGU's membership) was formed largely due to his personal property (near New York) that was bequeathed to AGU.

== Personal history ==
Born in Parma, Michigan, he earned his B.S. from Albion College in 1897. After his graduation, he went to work for his uncle, George Rafter, a prominent civil engineer. Rafter had commissioned a weir study, the results of which Horton analyzed and summarized. In 1900, he was appointed New York District Engineer of the United States Geological Survey. In the later part of his career, he went on to be a private consultant in hydrologic science. His consulting practice included scholarly works (printing of technical books translated from other languages, French, German, Italian, Ukrainian) and conducting theoretical and experimental research with an outdoor lab (Horton Hydrological Laboratory) modeled after Cornell's Hydraulic Lab.

== Broader contributions in hydrology ==
During his studies of New York streams, Horton determined that the degree to which rainfall could reach the aquifer depended on a certain property of the soil, which he called infiltration capacity. He analyzed and separated the water cycle into the processes of infiltration, evaporation, interception, transpiration, overland flow, etc. Horton was the first to demarcate and label these now-familiar stages of the cycle.

Horton is well known for his study of maximum runoff and flood generation. His concept of maximum possible rainfall, limiting the effect of rainfall in specific regions, has had a major effect on meteorology. His studies of overland flow aided in the understanding of soil erosion and provided a scientific basis for soil conservation efforts. His experimental work, including conducted at the Horton Hydrological Laboratory spanned processes such as: snow melt process, river hydrodynamics, thunderstorm vortex rings, lake evaporation and wind speed experiments, among others. He combined his experimental observations with theory, and his theoretical approach was both empirical and physics based.

Having realized early in his career that the physical character of terrain played a large role in determining runoff patterns, he resolved to isolate the physical factors affecting runoff and flood discharge. He believed these to include drainage density, channel slope, overland flow length, and other less important factors. However, late in his career, he began to advocate a very different mechanism of "hydrophysical" geomorphology, which he believed better explained his prior observations.

Horton detailed his theory in a landmark paper published in 1945, only a month before his death, in the Bulletin of the Geological Society of America. He summarized his conclusions with four laws: the law of stream numbers, the law of stream lengths, the limits of infiltration capacity, and the runoff-detention-storage relation. His results demonstrate that the salient factor in aqueous soil erosion is the minimum length of overland flow necessary to produce enough runoff to affect erosion. This seminal work may be considered the founding of modern stream chemistry modeling, since it was the first comprehensive set of mathematical models to link basin hydrology with a water pollutant, namely sediment. The term Horton overland flow is named after his accomplishments in hydrology.

== Unrecognized contribution on evaporation ==
Horton's contributions to the theory of evaporation were ignored for over 100 years and was recently shown to have great contemporary value, for land surface models which serve as in-land boundary conditions for global climate models. His work also provides a physical basis to explain the notorious "Evaporation Paradox", which has not been well understood with a sound physical basis.

== Archives of his work ==
The National Archives at College Park ("Archives II") in College Park, Maryland hosts 94 boxes of Horton's work. Two hydrologists, Keith Beven from Lancaster University, and James Smith from Princeton University, have paid visit to the archive and reported their findings. Smaller archives of his work appear to exist in multiple places, Albion College (his alma mater) and possibly other places.

A renewed effort by Dr. Solomon Vimal led to a crowdfunding initiative that began in 2023 via GoFundMe to recover Horton's published and unpublished works from the National Archive, which has received contributions from over 30 hydrologists worldwide. A book and 30+ papers have been drafted from this initiative to fully recover Horton's lost treasure trove of works.

== Selected publications ==
- Horton, R E. (1901). Available water power of Michigan. LCCN 06001228.
- Horton, R. E. (1906). Weir Experiments, Coefficients, and Formulas. LCCN gs06000328.
- Veatch, Arthur Clifford; Slichter, Charles S.; Bowman, Isaiah; Crosby, William Otis; Horton, R.E. (1906). "Underground water resources of Long Island, New York". USGS Report: 2. Bibcode:1906usgs.rept....2V. doi:10.3133/pp44.
- Barrows, Harold Kilbrith; Horton, R. E. (1907). Determination of stream flow during the frozen season. LCCN gs07000166.
- Horton, R. E. (1931). "The field, scope, and status of the science of hydrology". Eos, Transactions American Geophysical Union. 12 (1): 189–202. Bibcode:1931TrAGU..12..189H. doi:10.1029/tr012i001p00189-2.
- Horton, R. E. (1932). "Drainage-basin characteristics". Eos, Transactions American Geophysical Union. 13 (1): 350–361. Bibcode:1932TrAGU..13..350H. doi:10.1029/tr013i001p00350. (over 3100 citations)
- Horton, R. E. (1933). "The Rôle of infiltration in the hydrologic cycle". Eos, Transactions American Geophysical Union. 14 (1): 446–460. Bibcode:1933TrAGU..14..446H. doi:10.1029/tr014i001p00446. (over 2850 citations)
- Horton, R. E. (1945). "Erosional Development of Streams and Their Drainage Basins; Hydrophysical Approach to Quantitative Morphology". Geological Society of America Bulletin. 56 (3): 275. doi:10.1130/0016-7606(1945)56[275:EDOSAT]2.0.CO;2. ISSN 0016-7606. Archived from the original on 2021-04-17. (over 9700 citations)

== See also ==
- Surface runoff
- Extensions of Horton Formulas (Italian Wikipedia)
