= Valeryan Uryvaev =

Soviet hydrologist

Valeryan Andreyevich Uryvaev was an eminent Soviet hydrologist and the head of Russian State Hydrological Institute from 1942–1968. He was a graduate of the Moscow Hydrometeorological Institute. A research vessel was named after him.
