= Mariotte's bottle =

Hydrodynamic physics demonstration

Diagram of Mariotte's bottle

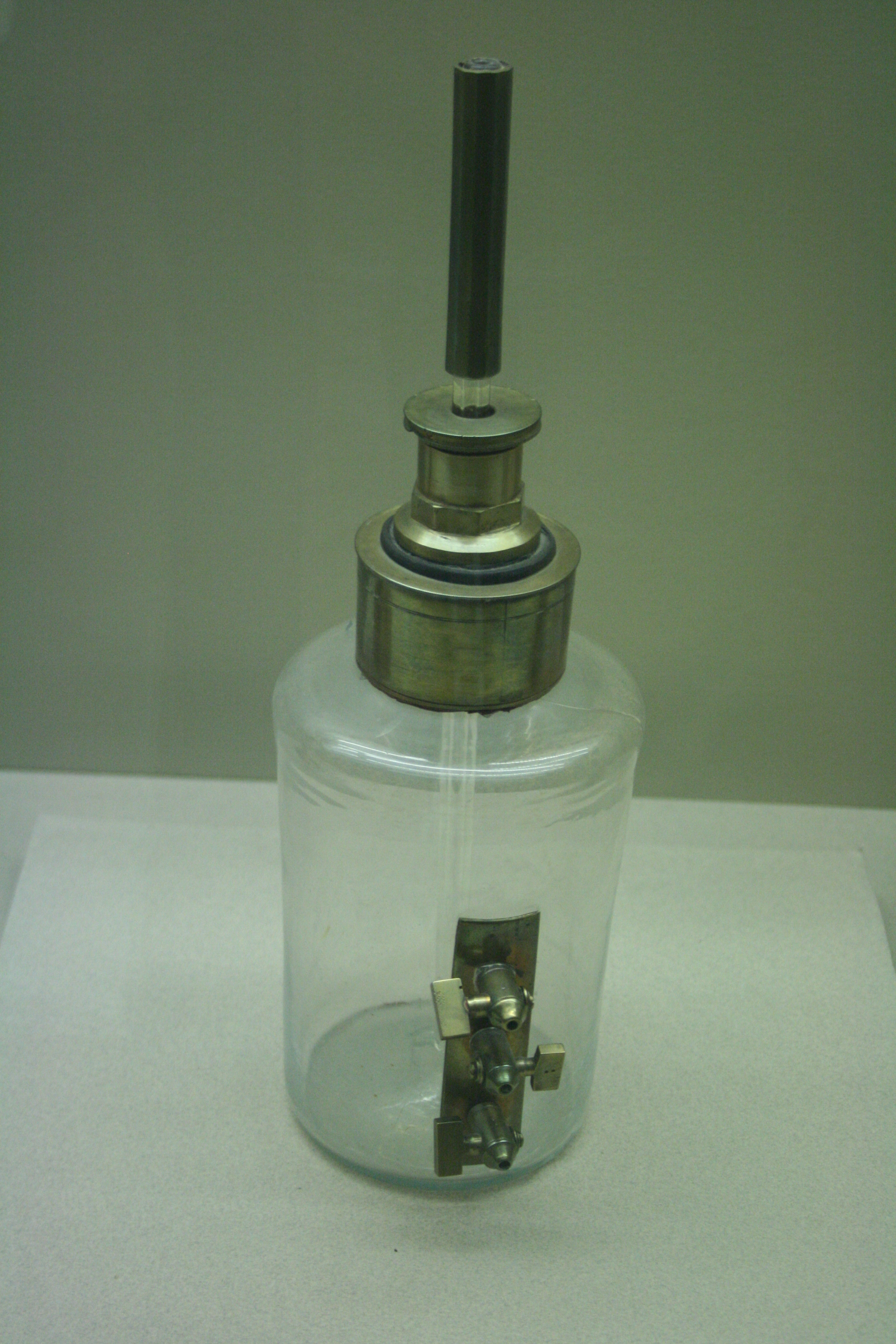
Mariotte's bottle

Mariotte's bottle is a device that delivers a constant rate of flow from closed bottles or tanks. It is named after French physicist Edme Mariotte (1620-1684). A picture of a bottle with a gas inlet is shown in the works of Mariotte, but this construction was made to show the effect of outside pressure on mercury level inside the bottle. It further misses a siphon or an outlet for the liquid.

== Invention ==
The design was first reported by McCarthy (1934). As shown in the diagram, a stoppered reservoir is supplied with an air inlet and a siphon. The pressure at the bottom of the air inlet is always the same as the pressure outside the reservoir, i.e. the atmospheric pressure. If it were greater, air would not enter. If the entrance to the siphon is at the same depth, then it will always supply the water at atmospheric pressure and will deliver a flow under constant head height, regardless of the changing water level within the reservoir.

This apparatus has many variations in design and has been used extensively when a constant water pressure is needed, e.g. supplying water at constant head for measuring water infiltration into soil or supplying the mobile phase in chromatography.

The drawback of the design is that it is sensitive for gas inlet leakage and that during operation liquid cannot be added, since it would change the pressure control. Accurate control is nowadays provided by electronic devices.

== Applications ==
Constant head is important in simplifying constraint when measuring the movement of water in soil. Several measurement techniques employ the Mariotte's bottle to provide constant head. The Guelph Permeameter measures unsaturated hydraulic conductivity in the field and uses this principle to create a constant head. Single and double ring infiltrometers can also use the Marriotte's bottle.

Another application is a similar arrangement in some fuel tanks used in control line model airplanes, where it is called a "uniflow" tank, where the tank venting tubing goes to the end of the prismatic tank, close to the fuel pick-up tube that feeds the engine; thus, when fuel is consumed, the uniflow tank supplies approximately the same pressure, regardless of the quantity of fuel that remains in the tank for the rest of the flight, which keeps the same carburetor calibration and air-fuel ratio.

== See also ==
- Infiltrometer
