= ECHAM =

General circulation model

ECHAM is a general circulation model (GCM) developed by the Max Planck Institute for Meteorology, one of the research organisations of the Max Planck Society. It was created by modifying global forecast models developed by ECMWF to be used for climate research. The model was given its name as a combination of its origin (the 'EC' being short for 'ECMWF') and the place of development of its parameterisation package, Hamburg. The default configuration of the model resolves the atmosphere up to 10 hPa (primarily used to study the lower atmosphere), but it can be reconfigured to 0.01 hPa for use in studying the stratosphere and lower mesosphere.

Different versions of ECHAM, primarily different configurations of ECHAM5, have been the basis of many publications, listed on the ECHAM5 website.

== ECHAM5 ==
Compared to its predecessor, ECHAM4, it is more portable and flexible (it is now written in the programming language Fortran 95), and because of both major and minor changes to the different parts of code that it uses, it produces a significantly different simulated climate.

MPI-ECHAM5 was used in the IPCC Fourth Assessment Report, alongside many other GCMs from different countries. In the data of this report, it is referred to with the abbreviation MPEH5.

It appears to be one of the more accurate GCMs.

== ECHAM6 ==
ECHAM6 is currently the most advanced version of the ECHAM models. ECHAM6 is an atmospheric general circulation model, and as such focuses on the coupling between diabatic processes and large-scale circulations, both of which are ultimately driven by radiative forcing. It consists of a dry spectral-transform dynamical core, a transport model for scalar quantities other than temperature and surface pressure, a suite of physical parameterizations for the representation of diabatic processes, as well as boundary data sets for externalized parameters, such as trace gas and aerosol distributions, tabulations of gas absorption optical properties, temporal variations in spectral solar irradiance, land-surface properties, etc.

The major changes relative to ECHAM5 include: An improved representation of radiative transfer in the shortwave (or solar) part of the spectrum; a completely new description of aerosols; an improved representation of surface albedo, including the treatment of melt-ponds on sea ice; and a greatly improved representation of the middle-atmosphere as part of the standard model. In addition, minor changes have been made in the representation of convective processes, and through the choice of a slightly different vertical discretization within the troposphere, as well as changed model parameters.
