= State Hydrological Institute =

Russian research institute

Coordinates: 59°56′31″N 30°17′12″E

- Государственный гидрологический институт
- Established: October 1919
- Field of research: Hydrology
- Director: Sergey Zhuravlyov
- Staff: 200
- Location: Saint Petersburg, Russia
- Website: hydrology.ru

The State Hydrological Institute (SHI; Russian: Государственный гидрологический институт, ГГИ) is a research institute of Russia in the field of developing methods for locating hydrological networks and river hydrometry, creating modern models and methods for accelerated measurements of water discharge, runoff accounting at hydroelectric power plants and other hydrology structures. SHI is created under the initiative of the Russian Academy of Sciences in October 1919. The institute cooperates with international organizations such as UNESCO and the World Meteorological Organization.

== Structure ==
SHI has about 350 employees. The research staff includes about 60 doctors. The institute currently includes such departments as:

- Department of Valday for hydrometeorological experimental research
- Major experimental laboratory in a town Ilichovo
- Department of runoff calculation and water management problems
- Department of channel processes
- Department of metrology and standardization
- Department of hydrophysics
- Department of researching of hydroecology
- Department of water resources and water balance
- Department of scientific-technical information
- Department of flooding research
- Department of climate change research
- Department of remote sensing methods and geoinformation systems
- Department of river network
- Department of water cadastre

== Notable staff ==
- Vladimir Wiese (1886–1954), a Russian and Soviet oceanographer and explorer of the Arctic
- Mikhail Budyko (1920–2001), a Soviet and Russian climatologist
- Valeryan Uryvaev (1908–1968), a Soviet hydrologist and director of the institute from 1942 to 1968
- Igor Shiklomanov (1939–2010), a Soviet and Russian hydrologist and director of the institute from 1981 to 2010
- Oleg Anisimov (1957–), a Russian climate scientist
