= Interception (water) =

Precipitation that is intercepted by vegetation before reaching the soil

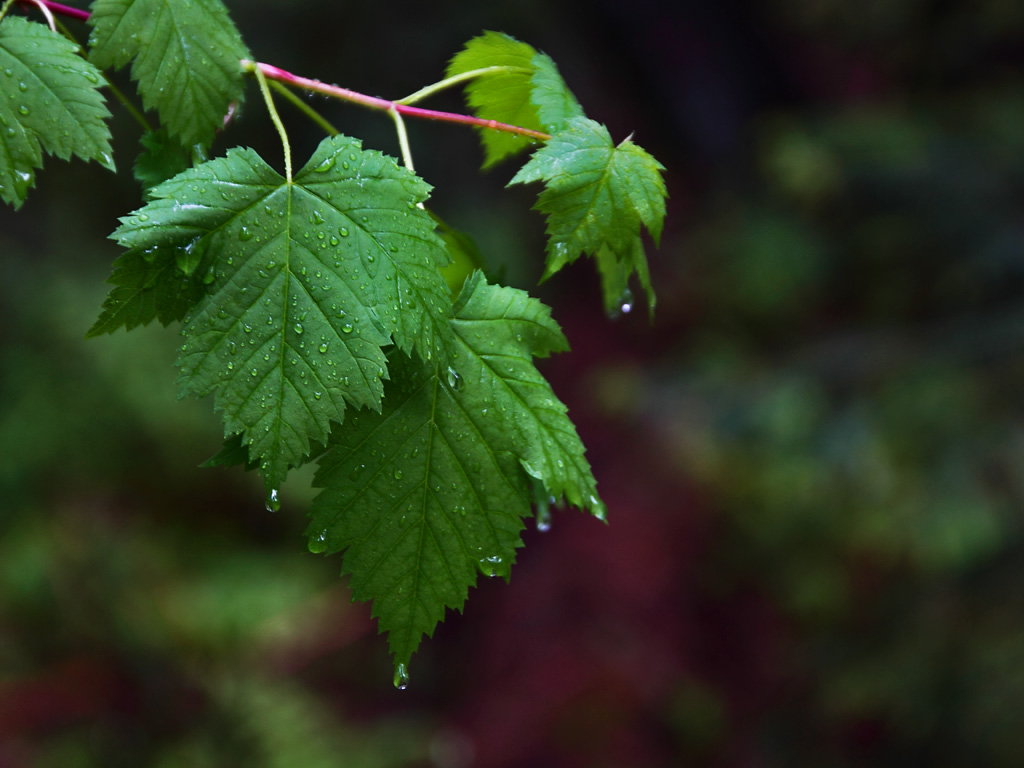
Rain collecting on an acer leaf

Interception refers to precipitation that does not reach the soil, but is instead intercepted by the leaves, branches of plants and the forest floor. It occurs in the canopy (i.e. canopy interception), and in the forest floor or litter layer (i.e. forest floor interception). Because of evaporation, interception of liquid water generally leads to loss of that precipitation for the drainage basin, except for cases such as fog interception, but increase flood protection dramatically, Alila et al., (2009).

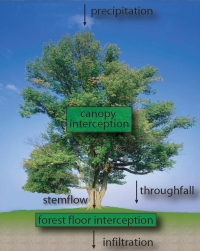
Definition of canopy and forest floor interception

Intercepted snowfall does not result in any notable amount of evaporation, and most of the snow falls off the tree by wind or melts. However, intercepted snow can more easily drift with the wind, out of the watershed. Conifers have a greater interception capacity than hardwoods. Their needles gives them more surface area for droplets to adhere to, and they have foliage in spring and fall, therefore interception also depends on the type of vegetation in a wooded area.

Mitscherlich in 1971 calculated the water storage potential as interception values for different species and stand densities. A storm event might produce 50 – 100 mm of rainfall and 4 mm might be the maximum intercepted in this way. Grah and Wilson in 1944 did sprinkling experiments where they watered plants to see how much of the intercepted is kept after watering stops.

Trees like Norway maple and a small-leaved lime have an interception of approximately 38% of the gross precipitation in temperate climate.

The interception depends on the leaf area index and what kind of leaves they are.

Interception may increase erosion or reduce it depending on the throughfall effects.

== See also ==
- Stemflow
- Throughfall
- Forest floor interception
- Water ball
