= Horton overland flow =

Tendency of water to flow horizontally

In soil science, Horton overland flow describes the tendency of water to flow horizontally across land surfaces when rainfall has exceeded infiltration capacity and depression storage capacity. It is named after Robert E. Horton, the engineer who made the first detailed studies of the phenomenon.

Paved surfaces such as asphalt, which are designed to be flat and impermeable, rapidly achieve Horton overland flow. It is shallow, sheetlike, and fast-moving, and hence capable of extensively eroding soil and bedrock.

Horton overland flow is most commonly encountered in urban construction sites and unpaved rural roads, where vegetation has been stripped away, exposing bare dirt. The process also poses a significant problem in areas with steep terrain, where water can build up great speed and where soil is less stable, and in farmlands, where soil is flat and loose.

== See also ==
- Horton's equation
- Urban runoff
