= Czesław Zakaszewski =

Polish hydro-technician and meliorator

- Born: 19 July 1886; Warsaw, Poland
- Died: 2 February 1959 (aged 72)
- Resting place: Powązki Cemetery, Warsaw
- Scientific career
- Fields: Hydrology
- Workplaces: Warsaw University of Technology

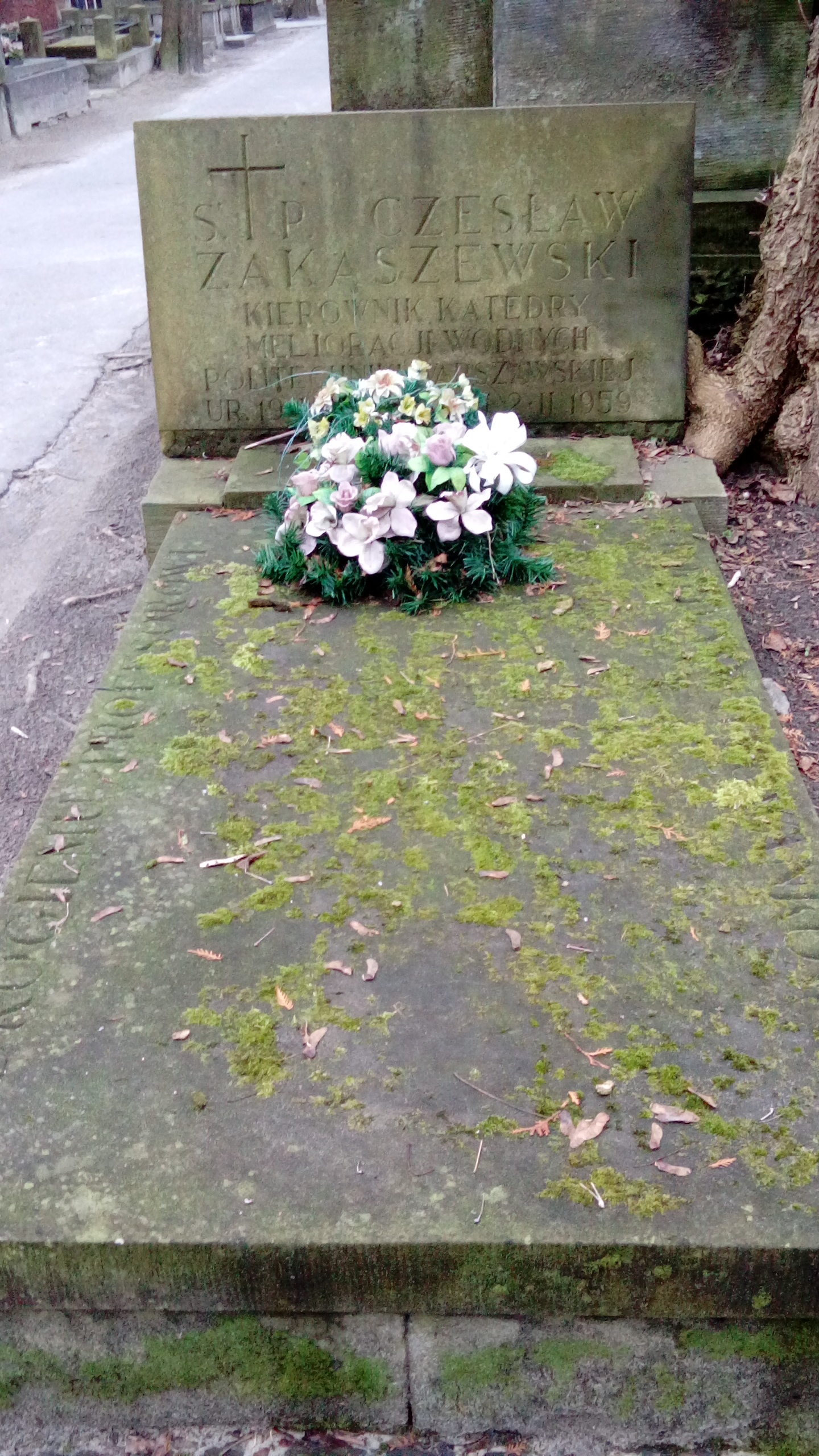
Tomb of Czesław Zakaszewski

Czesław Zakaszewski (19 July 1886 in Warsaw – 2 February 1959 in Warsaw) was a Polish hydro-technician and meliorator. Professor of the Warsaw University of Technology, member of the Warsaw Scientific Society.

He was an author of numerous technical projects, thesis and textbooks.

== Notable works ==
Books

- Zakaszewski, Czesław (1956). Melioracje rolne (in Polish). Warsaw: Państwowe Wydawnictwo Rolnicze i Leśne.

Articles

- "Zasoby wodne i gospodarowanie nimi jako przesłanki w planowaniu przestrzennym i lokalizacji"
- "Perspektywy rozwiązań obecnych trudności gospodarki wodnej"
- "Dolina Neru jako urządzenie gospodarcze"

Reports and co-reports

- "Wpływ kanału żeglugi Żerań-Zegrze na stosunki wodne tarasu praskiego"
