= Pipeflow =

Type of subterranean water flow

In hydrology, pipeflow is a type of subterranean water flow where water travels along cracks in the soil or old root systems found in above ground vegetation.

In such soils which have a high vegetation content water is able to travel along the 'pipes', allowing water to travel faster than throughflow. Here, water can move at speeds between 50 and 500 m/h.
