= Infiltrometer =

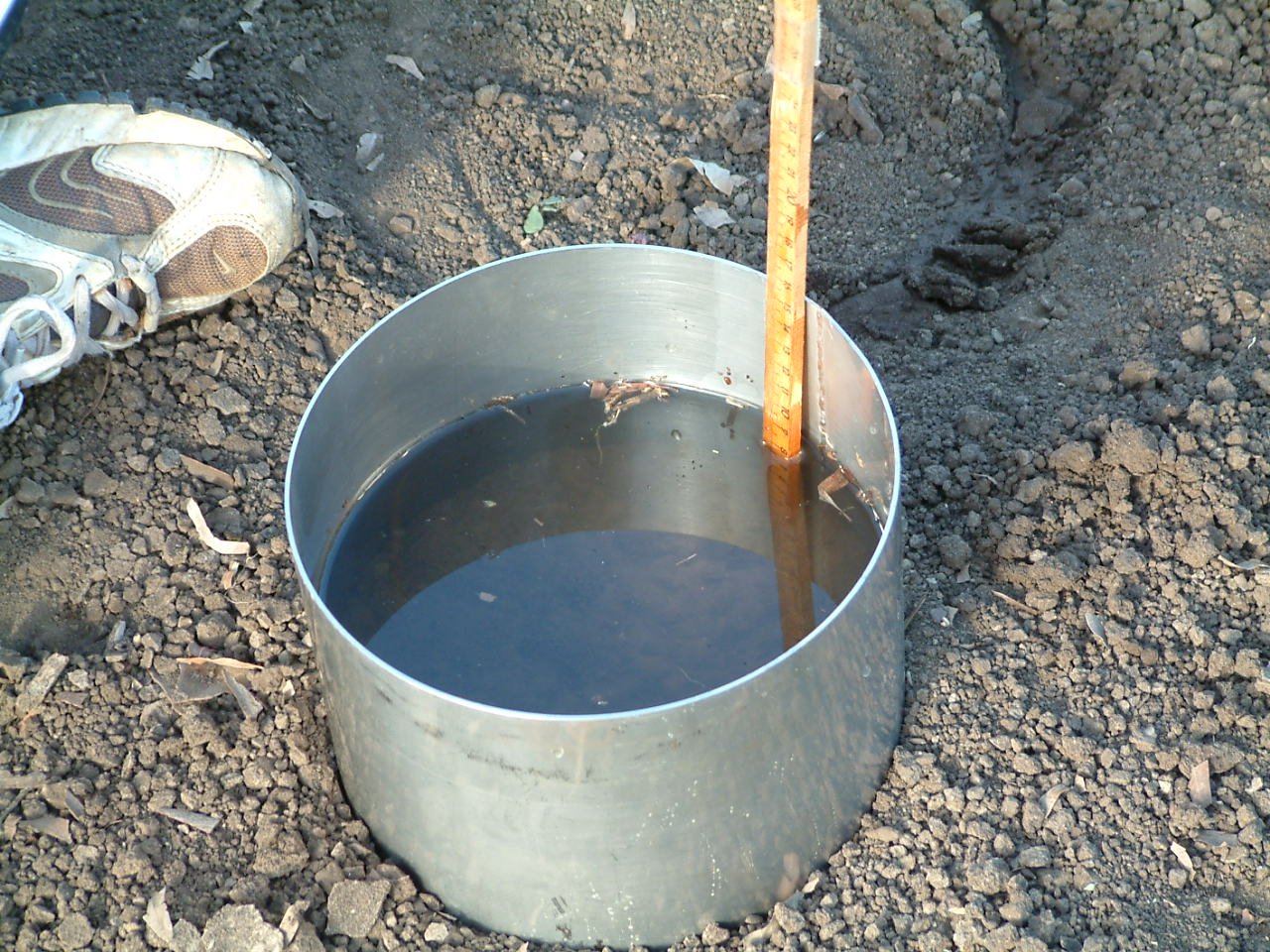
Single ring infiltrometer

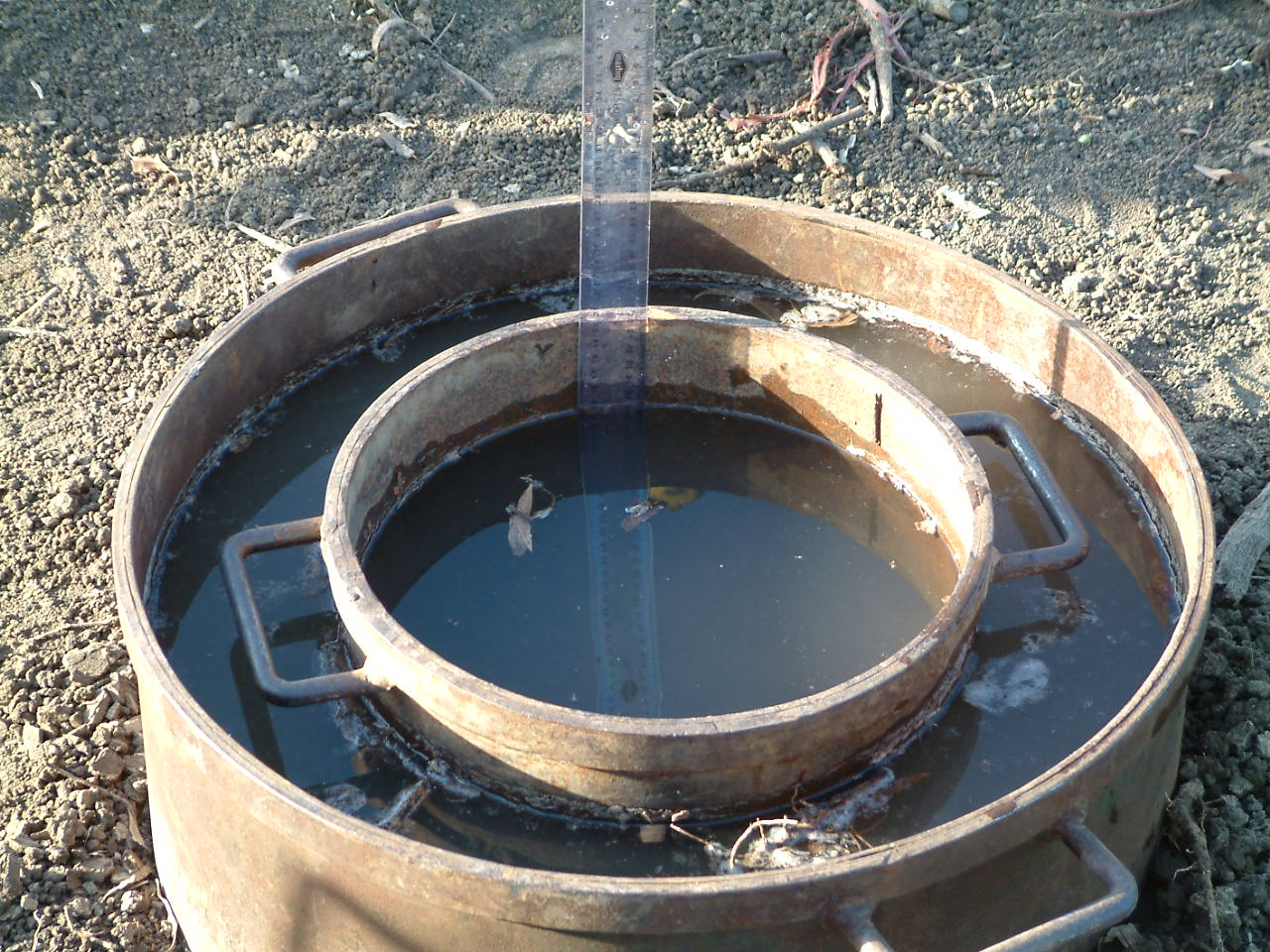
Double ring infiltrometer

An infiltrometer is a device used to measure the rate of water infiltration into soil or other porous media. Commonly used infiltrometers are single-ring and double-ring infiltrometers, disc permeameters, and falling head infiltrometers.

== Single ring ==
A single-ring infiltrometer involves driving a ring into the soil and supplying water in the ring either at constant head or falling head condition. Constant head refers to condition where the amount of water in the ring is always held constant. Because infiltration capacity is the maximum infiltration rate, and if infiltration rate exceeds the infiltration capacity, runoff will be the consequence, therefore maintaining constant head means the rate of water supplied corresponds to the infiltration capacity. The supplying of water is done with a Mariotte's bottle. Falling head refers to condition where water is supplied in the ring, and the water is allowed to drop with time. The operator records how much water goes into the soil for a given time period. The rate of which water goes into the soil is related to the soil's hydraulic conductivity.

== Double ring ==
A double ring infiltrometer requires two rings: an inner and outer ring. The purpose is to create a one-dimensional flow of water from the inner ring, as the analysis of data is simplified. If water is flowing in one-dimension at steady state condition, and a unit gradient is present in the underlying soil, the infiltration rate is approximately equal to the saturated hydraulic conductivity.

An inner ring is driven into the ground, and a second bigger ring around that to help control the flow of water through the first ring. Water is supplied either with a constant or falling head condition, and the operator records how much water infiltrates from the inner ring into the soil over a given time period. The ASTM standard method specifies inner and outer rings of 30 and 60 cm diameters, respectively.

== Issues ==
There are several challenges related to the use of ring infiltrometers:

1. The pounding of the infiltrometer into the ground deforms the soil, compressing it or causing cracks which can affect the measured infiltration capacity.
2. Ring infiltrometers cannot reliably characterize infiltration of furrow irrigation, of sprinkler irrigation, or of rainfall.
3. With single ring infiltrometers, water spreads laterally as well as vertically and the analysis is more difficult.
