= Russian State Hydrometeorological University =

- Российский государственный гидрометеорологический университет
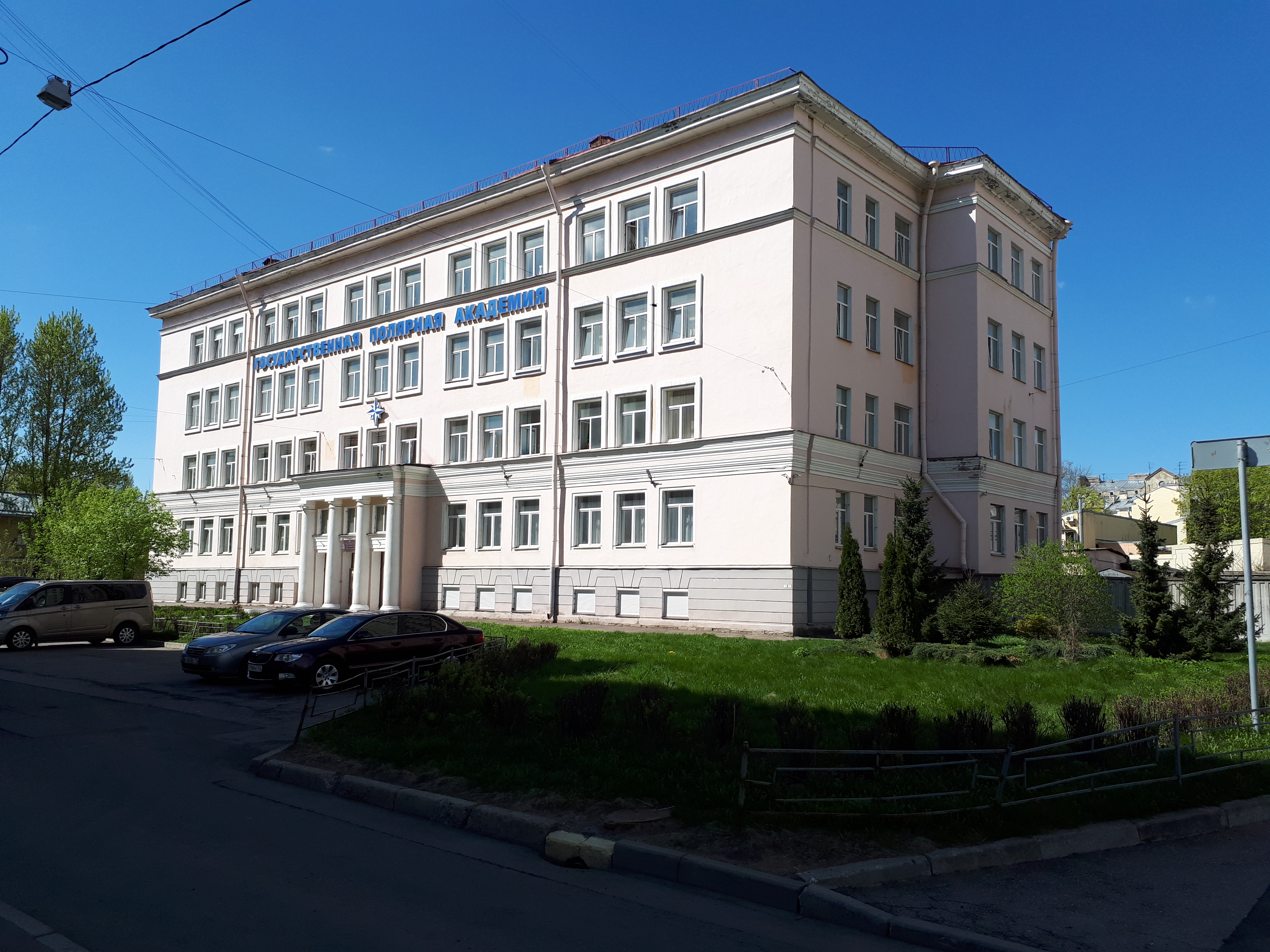
- Building of the former State Polar Academy on Voronezhskaya Street, 79 (current legal address)
- Type: Public
- Established: 1930
- Rector: Valeriy Mikheev
- Location: St. Petersburg, Russia; 59°54′33″N 30°20′33″E
- Campus: Urban
- Website: www.rshu.ru/eng/

Russian State Hydrometeorological University (RSHU) (Russian: Российский государственный гидрометеорологический университет) is a coeducational and public research university located in St. Petersburg, Russia. It was founded on July 23, 1930. For all the time RSHU have trained more than 20,000 professionals, with more than 3,000 for foreign countries. Current rector is acting Valeriy Mikheev due to the death of the previous rector Lev Karlin.

== History ==
Russian State Hydrometeorological University was established on July 23, 1930, on the basis of Geophysical Department of the Faculty of Physics of the MSU as Moscow Hydrometeorological Institute.

After World War II the university was transferred to Leningrad and renamed as Leningrad Hydrometeorological Institute (LHI). The institute became the world's first institution of higher education with hydrometeorological profile.

In 1992, it was renamed the Russian State Hydrometeorological Institute (RSHI). In 1998, it was renamed as Russian State Hydrometeorological University (current name).

== Faculties ==
RSHU consists of 8 faculties:

- Meteorological Faculty
- Hydrological Faculty
- Oceanological Faculty
- Ecological Faculty
- Information Systems and Geotechnologies
- Economics, Social Sciences and Humanities
- Philological
- National and Traditional Arts

== University rating ==
Center for Promotion of graduates conducted monitoring of university centers of youth employment in 2011. According to the results of this monitoring RSHU took 12th place among the universities of the Russian Federation, and the 3rd place among the universities of St. Petersburg. According to the rating of public universities in Russia in 2010 RSHU ranked 141 out of 1,527 Russian universities in the overall rankings, 23 out of 94 universities of St. Petersburg.

== International collaboration ==
The university is a member of the University of the Arctic. UArctic is an international cooperative network based in the Circumpolar Arctic region, consisting of more than 200 universities, colleges, and other organizations with an interest in promoting education and research in the Arctic region. The collaboration has been paused after the beginning of the Russo-Ukrainian War in 2022.

== See also ==
- Education in Russia
- List of universities in Russia
