= Stemflow =

In hydrology, stemflow is the flow of intercepted water down the trunk or stem of a plant. Stemflow, along with throughfall, is responsible for the transferral of precipitation and nutrients from the canopy to the soil. In tropical rainforests, where this kind of flow can be substantial, erosion gullies can form at the base of the trunk. However, in more temperate climates stemflow levels are low and have little erosional power.

== Measurement ==
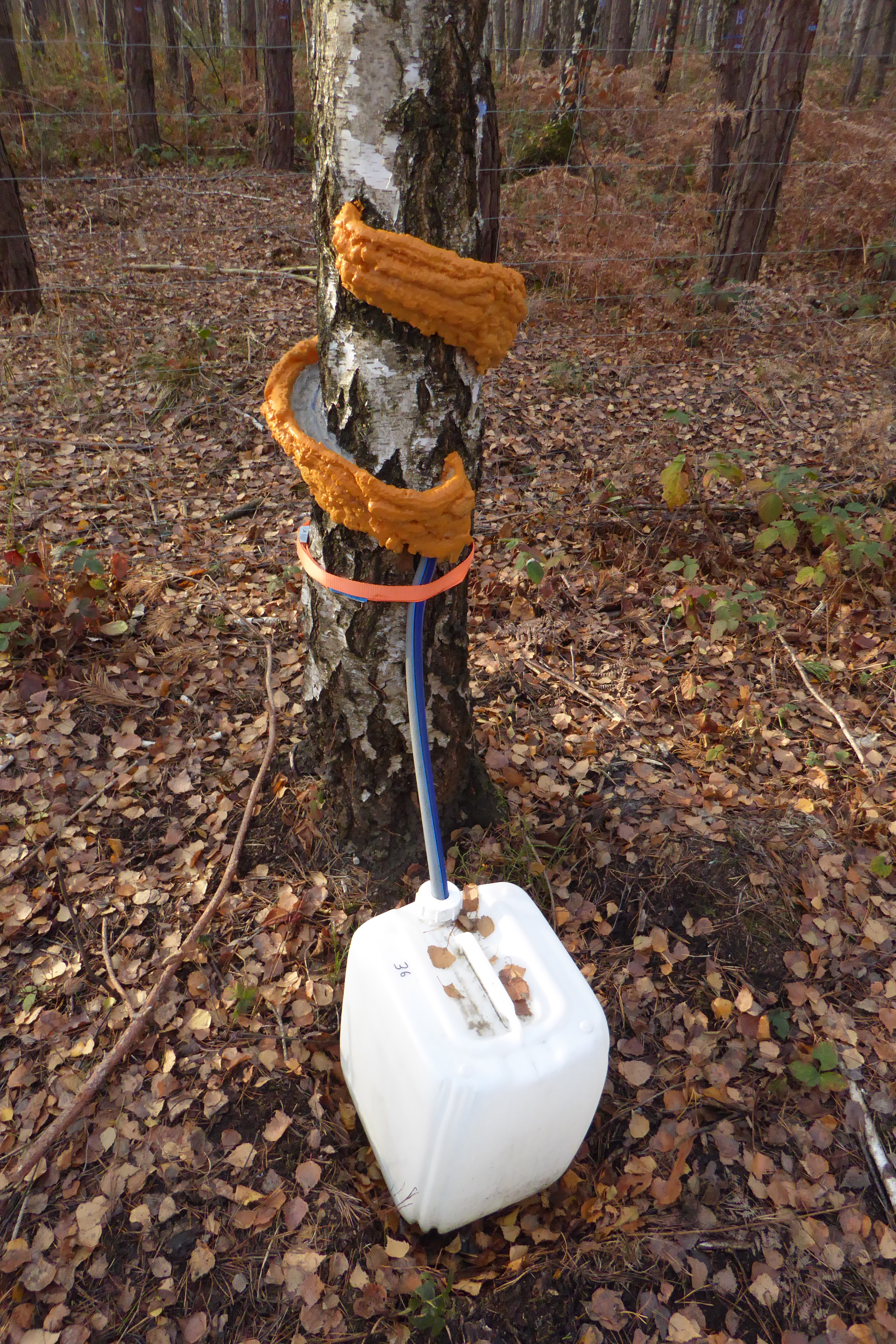
Stem flow measurement on a silver birch

There are a variety of ways stemflow volume is measured in the field. The most common direct measurement currently used is the bonding of bisected PVC or other plastic tubing around the circumference of the tree trunk, connected and funneled into a graduated cylinder for manual or a tipping bucket rain gauge for automatic collection. At times the tubing is wrapped multiple times around the trunk is order to ensure more complete collection.

== Determining factors ==
Precipitation

The primary meteorological characteristics of a rainfall event that influence stemflow are:

- Rainfall continuity – the more frequent and extended are the gaps during the event where no rainfall occurs, the higher the likelihood that potential stemflow volume is lost to evapotranspiration; this is also governed by air temperature, relative humidity and most significantly, wind speed
- Rainfall intensity – the amount of total stemflow is diminished when the amount of rain in a given period surpasses the capacity of the flow paths
- Rain angle – stemflow generally starts earlier when rainfall is more horizontal; this is more of a determinant in an open forest with a lesser degree of crown closure

Species

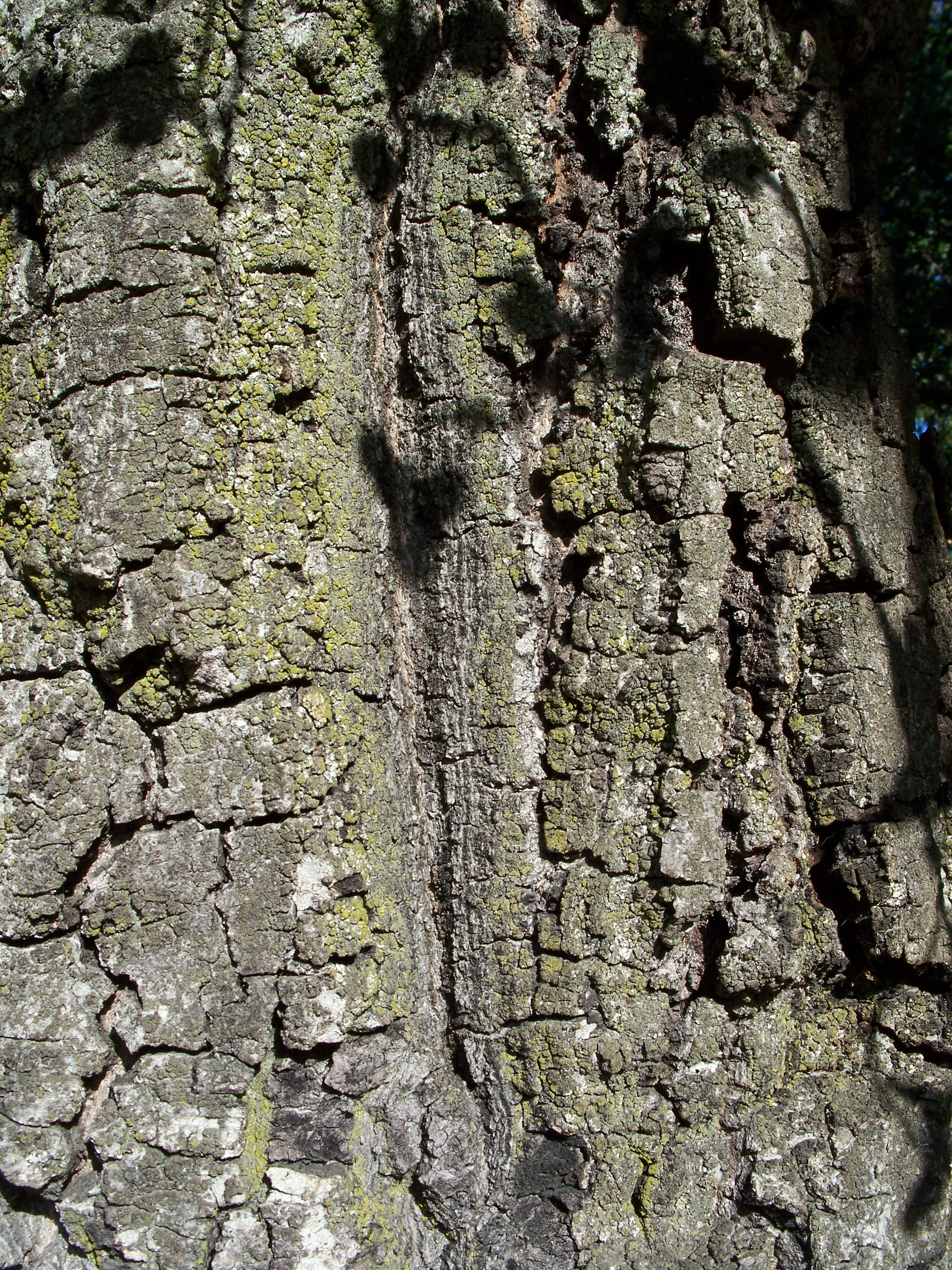
Stemflow in oaks is relatively low, due to their textured bark, few and horizontal branches, and high incidence of absorbent epiphytes.

The species of the tree affects the amount of timing and stemflow. The particular morphological characteristics that are key factors are:

- Crown size – stemflow potential is greater as crown size relative to the diameter at breast height increases. However, the greater the DBH, the more incident rainfall is needed to start stemflow.
- Leaf shape/orientation – leaves which are concave and elevated horizontally above the petiole are able to contribute to stemflow
- Branch angle – stemflow potential heightens as the angle of the branches and twigs in relation to the trunk decreases.
- Flow path obstructions – abnormalities on the flow path, such as detached pieces of bark or scars, on the underside of the branch can divert water from stemflow and become a component in throughfall
- Bark – stemflow is affected by the degree of absorptive ability and smoothness of the bark alongside the branch and stem. This is measured by using the Bark Relief Index, or BRI, which is the difference between the circumference of the tree and what the circumference would be if the tree had no bark.

Stand characteristics

In addition to the effects of individual tree species, the overall structure of the forest stand also influences the amount of stemflow that will ultimately occur, these factors are:

- Species composition – the total stemflow for the stand is determined by the contributions of individuals and their species-specific traits
- Stand density – morphological characteristics such as branch angle and thickness are largely determined by the amount of density of competing trees in the stand
- Canopy structure – individuals located in the understory in a stand with multiple vertically-stratified stories will have a lessened amount of total stemflow due to the interception of dominant and codominant individuals

Other

- Seasonality – in the case of deciduous or mixed forests, stemflow rates are slightly higher in the dormant season when no leaves are present and evapotranspiration is reduced; this effect becomes more pronounced as the stem diameter increases
- Diurnality – variations in branch weight influence the amount of stemflow; branches are heavier in the morning (with dew) and lighter in the afternoon

== Influence on soil ==
Chemistry

Nutrients that have accumulated on the canopy from dry deposition or animal feces are able to directly enter the soil through stemflow. When precipitation occurs, canopy nutrients are leached into the water because of the differences in nutrient concentration between the tree and the rainfall. Conversely, nutrients are taken up by the tree when concentration is lower in the canopy than the rainfall, the presence of epiphytes or lichens also contributes to uptake. The nutrients that enter the soil can also reflect the particular environmental conditions around them, for example, plants located in industrialized areas exhibit higher rates of sulfur and nitrogen (from air pollution), whereas those located near the oceans have higher rates of sodium (from seawater).

Soil acidification can be seen around some stems, for example beech trees from dry deposition.

Precipitation and morphological factors that influence stemflow timing and volume also affect the chemical composition; in general, stemflow water becomes more dilute during the course of a storm event, and rough-barked species contain more nutrients than smooth-barked species.

Water distribution

In forested areas, stemflow is considered a point-source input of water into the soil, thus water is more able to effectively penetrate past the topsoil into deeper layers of the soil horizon along tree roots and their subsequent creation of macropores (termed preferential flow). The loosening of the soil can result in minor landslides.

== See also ==
- Throughfall
- Canopy interception
- Forest floor interception
