= Disc permeameter =

Soil water infiltration measuring instrument

The disc permeameter is a field instrument used for measuring water infiltration in the soil, which is characterized by in situ saturated and unsaturated soil hydraulic properties. It is mainly used to provide estimates of the hydraulic conductivity of the soil near saturation.

== History ==
Conventional techniques for measuring in-situ infiltration include the use of a single or double ring infiltrometer. Single and double ring infiltrometer only measures flow under ponded (saturated) conditions, and when used in soil with distinct macropores, preferential flow will dominate the flow. (See: Poiseuille's law) This does not reflect infiltration under rainfall or sprinkler irrigation. Therefore, many authors attempted to create a negative potential (tension) on the water flow. This is to exclude macropores in the flow process, hence only measuring the soil matrix flow.

Willard Gardner and Walter Gardner developed a negative head permeameter as early as 1939. Dixon (1975) developed a closed-top ring infiltrometer to quantify macropores. Water is applied to a closed-top system, which permits the imposition of negative head or pressure on the ponded water surface. Negative tension can be considered as simulating a positive soil air pressure, created by a negative air pressure above ponded surface water. A simplification was made by Topp and Zebchuk (1985). The limitation of this device is the infiltration has to be started by ponding the closed-top infiltrometer (applying a positive head), then adjusted to a negative pressure. Little research effort was continued in this area, instead attention has been given mainly to the sorptivity apparatus of Dirksen (1975) which used a ceramic plate as a base. Based on this design, Brent Clothier and Ian White (1981) developed the sorptivity tube which can provide a constant negative potential (tension) on the soil surface. However, the sorptivity tube had many shortcomings, hence modifications to the design led to the development of the disc permeameter by Perroux and White (1988) from CSIRO. In the US it is known as the tension infiltrometer.

For more on the development of the first permeameter as told by Walter Gardner, visit (http://www.decagon.com/ag_research/hydro/history.php%5B%5D)

== The Disc ==
The CSIRO disc permeameter of Perroux and White (1988) (not patented) comprises a nylon mesh supply membrane (with a very small diameter around 10–40 mm), a water reservoir and a bubbling tower. The bubbling tower is connected to the reservoir and is open to air. The bubbling tower controls the potential h0 applied to the membrane by adjusting the water height in the air-inlet tube. So essentially the soil pores need to have energy equivalent to h0 to overcome water that is held under tension in the reservoir. It can be used to supply potential ranging -200 mm to 0 mm, effectively excluding pores with diameter bigger than 0.075 mm.

Many different designs have evolved, including:

- automated recording tension infiltrometer (Ankeny, Kaspar & Horton, 1988), patented by the Iowa State University (Soil Moisture Measurement https://web.archive.org/web/20060127085537/http://www.soilmeasurement.com/tension_infil.html)
- mini-disc infiltrometer (Decagon Devices, http://www.decagon.com/products/lysimeters-and-infiltrometers/mini-disk-tension-infiltrometer)
- hood infiltrometer (Umwelt-Geräte-Technik, http://www.ugt-online.de)

== Mathematical analysis ==
The CSIRO ponded disc permeameter

Due to the three-dimensional water flow from the disc, a special formulation is needed to take into account the lateral absorption of water. The analyses are derived from the simple, steady-state analysis of Wooding (1968). For steady infiltration from a circular, shallow, inundated area, Wooding found that a remarkable feature of this curve is the fact that it never departs far from the straight line:

$$Q* =  2 \pi a + 4$$

where Q* is the dimensionless flux, $a = \alpha r/2$. r is the radius of the disc [cm] and $\alpha$ [1/cm] is the sorptive number or the parameter of Gardner's (1958) hydraulic conductivity function:

$$K(h) =  K_s \mathrm{e}^{\alpha h}$$

where K is the hydraulic conductivity [cm/h], Ks is saturated conductivity and h is soil water potential [cm]. In terms of the actual steady-state infiltration rate q¥ [cm/h]:

$$q_\infty =  \alpha \phi_0 + \frac{4 \phi_0}{\pi_r}$$
