= Cetemps Hydrological Model =

CHyM (Cetemps Hydrological Model) is a distributed grid-based hydrological model developed by Cetemps Center of Excellence at the University of L'Aquila.
It has been created since 2002 by Dott. Marco Verdecchia, Barbara Tomassetti and Erika Coppola. One of the main characteristic of CHyM model is the extensive use of Cellular Automata (CA) based algorithms for drainage network extraction and rainfall data assimilation, for what concerns the specific application in CHyM code, see Coppola et al., 2007. ChyM can simulate the hydrological cycle in any geographical domain with any resolution up to 90 meters; drainage network is extracted by a native algorithm implemented in CHyM code, as a consequence no commercial software (like GIS) are needed to run the model. The main aim of CHyM is to provide a general purpose tool for flood alert mapping and hydrological risk management; characteristics of the model also allow to carry out long term simulation to investigate possible changes in hydrological cycle induced by climatic change. CHyM can assimilate different sets of precipitation data merging them in a hierarchical way at each hourly time step, these precipitation data can be obtained from raingauges observations, radar and satellite estimations and meteorological or climatic Limited Area Model (LAM). CHyM code is written using standard fortran language and the source code is provided by the authors for free to all no-profit institution for any kind of scientific application.
