= Terrain =

Dimension and shape of land surfaces

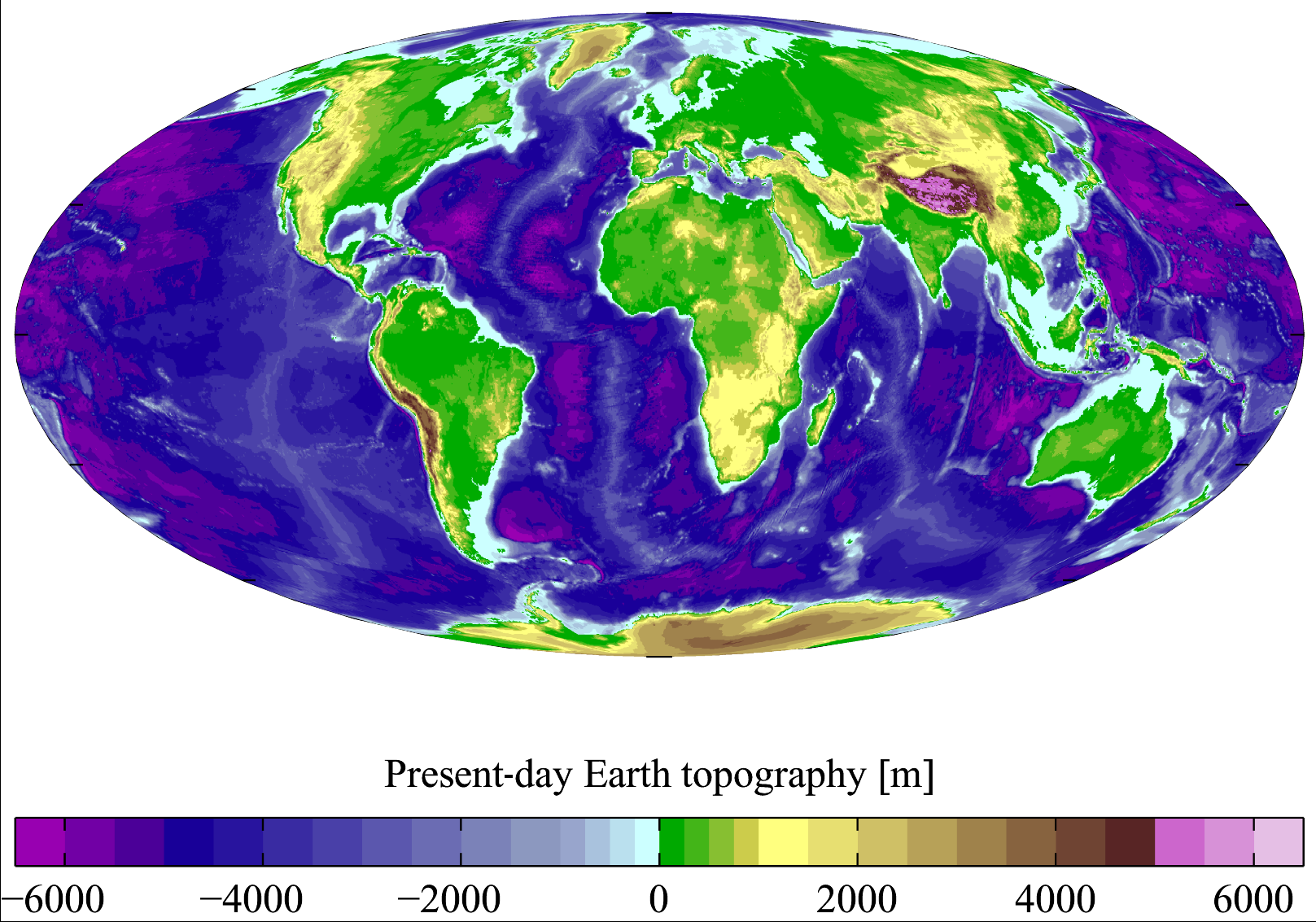
Present-day altimetry and bathymetry. Data from the National Geophysical Data Center's TerrainBase Digital Terrain Model.

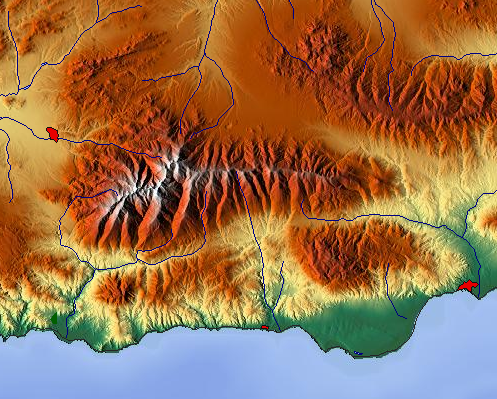
Relief map of Sierra Nevada, Spain

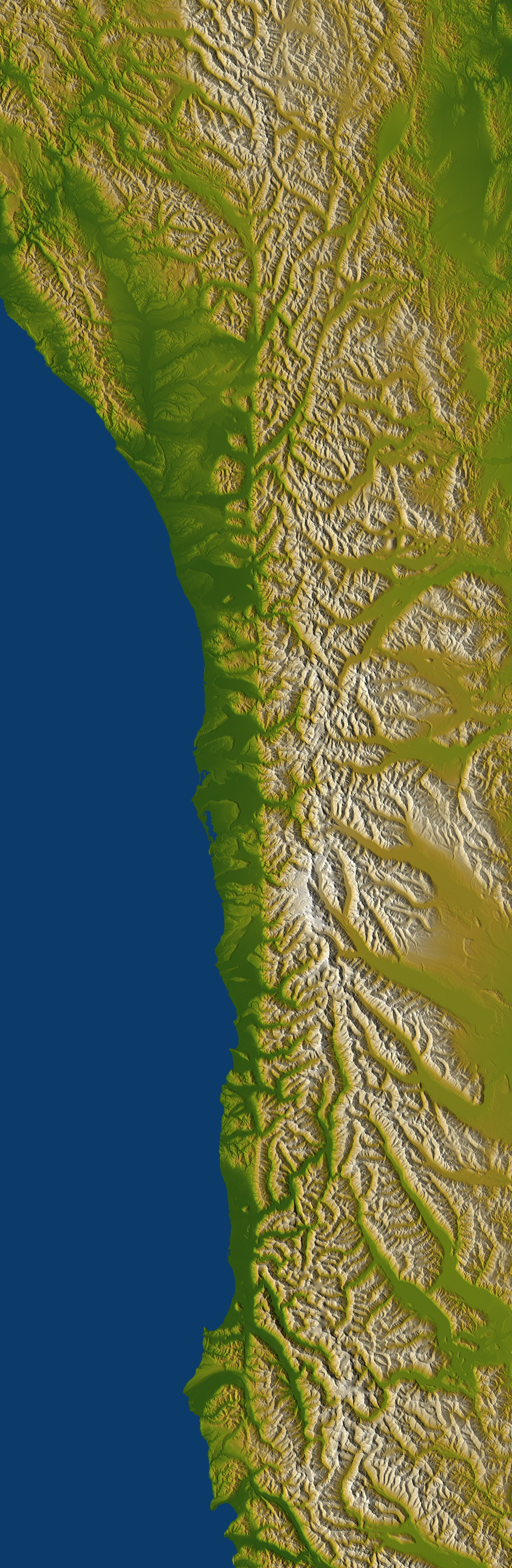
A shaded and colored image (i.e. terrain is enhanced) of varied terrain from the Shuttle Radar Topography Mission. This shows an elevation model of New Zealand's Alpine Fault, running about 500 km (310 mi) long. The escarpment is flanked by a vast chain of hills between the fault and the mountains of the Southern Alps. Northeast is towards the top.

Terrain (from Latin terra 'earth'), alternatively relief or topographical relief, is the surface of a piece of land (its shape and size). In physical geography, terrain is the lay of the land. This is usually expressed in terms of the elevation, slope, and orientation of terrain features. Terrain affects surface water flow and distribution. Over a large area, it can affect weather and climate patterns. Bathymetry is the study of underwater relief, while hypsometry studies terrain relative to sea level.

== Importance ==
The understanding of terrain is critical for many reasons:

- The terrain of a region largely determines its suitability for human settlement: flatter alluvial plains tend to have better farming soils than steeper, rockier uplands.
- In terms of environmental quality, agriculture, hydrology and other interdisciplinary sciences; understanding the terrain of an area assists the understanding of watershed boundaries, drainage characteristics, drainage systems, groundwater systems, water movement, and impacts on water quality. Complex arrays of relief data are used as input parameters for hydrology transport models (such as the Storm Water Management Model or DSSAM Models) to allow prediction of river water quality.
- Understanding terrain also supports soil conservation, especially in agriculture. Contour ploughing is an established practice enabling sustainable agriculture on sloping land; it is the practice of ploughing along lines of equal elevation instead of up and down a slope.
- Terrain is militarily critical because it determines the ability of armed forces to take and hold areas, and move troops and material into and through areas. An understanding of terrain is basic to both defensive and offensive strategy. The military usage of "terrain" is very broad, encompassing not only landform but land use and land cover, surface transport infrastructure, built structures and human geography, and, by extension under the term human terrain, even psychological, cultural, or economic factors.
- Terrain is important in determining weather patterns. Two areas geographically close to each other may differ radically in precipitation levels or timing because of elevation differences or a rain shadow effect.
- Precise knowledge of terrain is vital in aviation, especially for low-flying routes and maneuvers (see terrain collision avoidance) and airport altitudes. Terrain will also affect range and performance of radars and terrestrial radio navigation systems. Furthermore, a hilly or mountainous terrain can strongly impact the implementation of a new aerodrome and the orientation of its runways.

== Relief ==
Relief (or local relief) refers specifically to the quantitative measurement of vertical elevation change in a landscape. It is the difference between maximum and minimum elevations within a given area, usually of limited extent. A relief can be described qualitatively, such as a "low relief" or "high relief" plain or upland. The relief of a landscape can change with the size of the area over which it is measured, making the definition of the scale over which it is measured very important. Because it is related to the slope of surfaces within the area of interest and to the gradient of any streams present, the relief of a landscape is a useful metric in the study of the Earth's surface. Relief energy, which may be defined among other things as "the maximum height range in a regular grid", is essentially an indication of the ruggedness or relative height of the terrain.

== Geomorphology ==
Geomorphology is the long term study of the formation of terrain or topography. Terrain is formed by concurrent processes operating on the underlying geological structures over geological time:

- Geological processes: migration of tectonic plates, faulting and folding, mountain formation, volcanic eruptions, etc.
- Erosional processes: glacial, water, wind, chemical and gravitational (mass movement); such as landslides, downhill creep, flows, slumps, and rock falls.
- Extraterrestrial: meteorite impacts.

Tectonic processes such as orogenies and uplifts cause land to be elevated, whereas erosional and weathering processes wear the land away by smoothing and reducing topographic features. The relationship of erosion and tectonics rarely (if ever) reaches equilibrium. These processes are also codependent, however the full range of their interactions is still a topic of debate.

Land surface parameters are quantitative measures of various morphometric properties of a surface. The most common examples are used to derive slope or aspect of a terrain or curvatures at each location. These measures can also be used to derive hydrological parameters that reflect flow/erosion processes. Climatic parameters are based on the modelling of solar radiation or air flow.

Land surface objects, or landforms, are definite physical objects (lines, points, areas) that differ from the surrounding objects. The most typical examples airlines of watersheds, stream patterns, ridges, break-lines, pools or borders of specific landforms.

== Digital terrain model ==
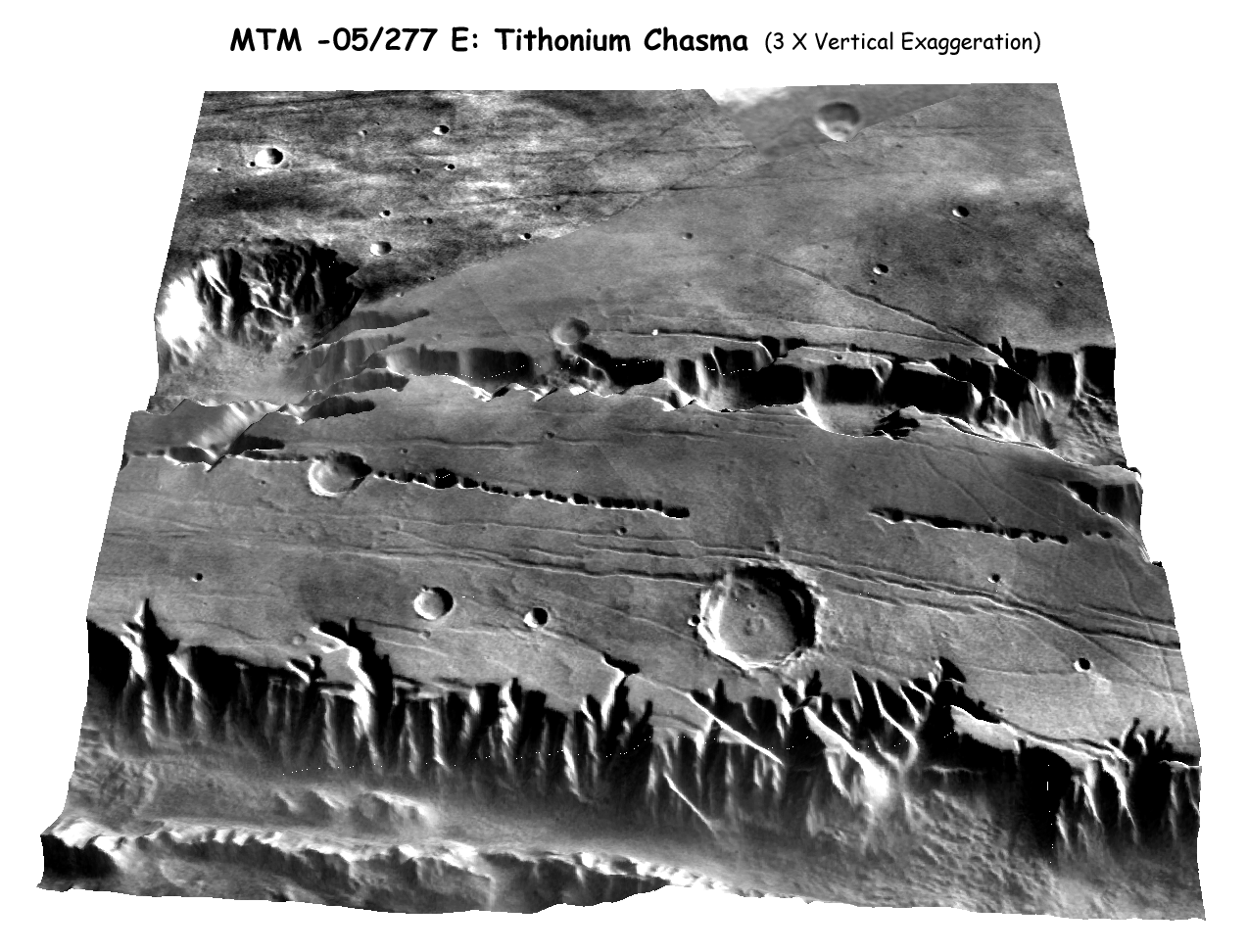
3D rendering of a DTM of Tithonium Chasma on Mars

A digital elevation model (DEM) or digital surface model (DSM) is a 3D computer graphics representation of elevation data to represent terrain or overlaying objects, commonly of a planet, moon, or asteroid. A "global DEM" refers to a discrete global grid. DEMs are used often in geographic information systems (GIS), and are the most common basis for digitally produced relief maps. A digital terrain model (DTM) represents specifically the ground surface while DEM and DSM may represent tree top canopy or building roofs.

While a DSM may be useful for landscape modeling, city modeling and visualization applications, a DTM is often required for flood or drainage modeling, land-use studies, geological applications, and other applications, and in planetary science.

== See also ==
- Applications of global navigation satellite systems (GNSS)
- Cartographic relief depiction (2D relief map)
- Geographic information system (GIS)
- Geomorphometry
- Hypsometry
- Isostasy
- Physical terrain model
- Relief ratio
- Subterranea
- Terrain awareness and warning system
- Terrane
- Topography
