= SWAT model =

SWAT (soil and water assessment tool) is a river basin scale model developed to quantify the impact of land management practices in large, complex watersheds. SWAT is a public domain software enabled model actively supported by the USDA Agricultural Research Service at the Blackland Research & Extension Center in Temple, Texas, USA. It is a hydrology model with the following components: weather, surface runoff, return flow, percolation, evapotranspiration, transmission losses, pond and reservoir storage, crop growth and irrigation, groundwater flow, reach routing, nutrient and pesticide loading, and water transfer. SWAT can be considered a watershed hydrological transport model. This model is used worldwide and is continuously under development. As of July 2012, more than 1000 peer-reviewed articles have been published that document its various applications.

== Model operation ==
SWAT is a continuous time model that operates on a daily time step at basin scale. The objective of such a model is to predict the long-term impacts in large basins of management and also timing of agricultural practices within a year (i.e., crop rotations, planting and harvest dates, irrigation, fertilizer, and pesticide application rates and timing). It can be used to simulate at the basin scale water and nutrients cycle in landscapes whose dominant land use is agriculture. It can also help in assessing the environmental efficiency of best management practices and alternative management policies. SWAT uses a two-level disaggregation scheme; a preliminary subbasin identification is carried out based on topographic criteria, followed by further discretization using land use and soil type considerations. Areas with the same soil type and land use form a Hydrologic Response Unit (HRU), a basic computational unit assumed to be homogeneous in hydrologic response to land cover change.

== Interfaces ==
- ArcSWAT Interface for ArcMap.
- QSWAT Interface for QGIS.

== See also ==
- Storm Water Management Model
- Stochastic Empirical Loading and Dilution Model
- Swat-CUP
- IPEAT - Integrated Parameter Estimation and Uncertainty Analysis Tool
- ALMANAC (software model)
