= DSSAM Model =

Water quality computer simulation

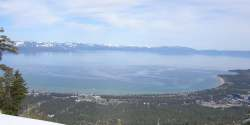
Lake Tahoe, headwater sub-basin of the Truckee River watershed

The DSSAM Model (Dynamic Stream Simulation and Assessment Model) is a computer simulation developed for the Truckee River to analyze water quality impacts from land use and wastewater management decisions in the Truckee River Basin. This area includes the cities of Reno and Sparks, Nevada as well as the Lake Tahoe Basin. The model is historically and alternatively called the Earth Metrics Truckee River Model. Since original development in 1984–1986 under contract to the U.S. Environmental Protection Agency (EPA), the model has been refined and successive versions have been dubbed DSSAM II and DSSAM III. This hydrology transport model is based upon a pollutant loading metric called Total maximum daily load (TMDL). The success of this flagship model contributed to the Agency's broadened commitment to the use of the underlying TMDL protocol in its national policy for management of most river systems in the United States.

The Truckee River has a length of over 115 miles (185 km) and drains an area of approximately 3120 square miles, not counting the extent of its Lake Tahoe sub-basin. The DSSAM model establishes numerous stations along the entire river extent as well as a considerable number of monitoring points inside the Great Basin's Pyramid Lake, the receiving waters of this closed hydrological system. Although the region is sparsely populated, it is important because Lake Tahoe is visited by 20 million persons per annum and Truckee River water quality affects at least two endangered species: the Cui-ui sucker fish and the Lahontan cutthroat trout.

== Development history ==
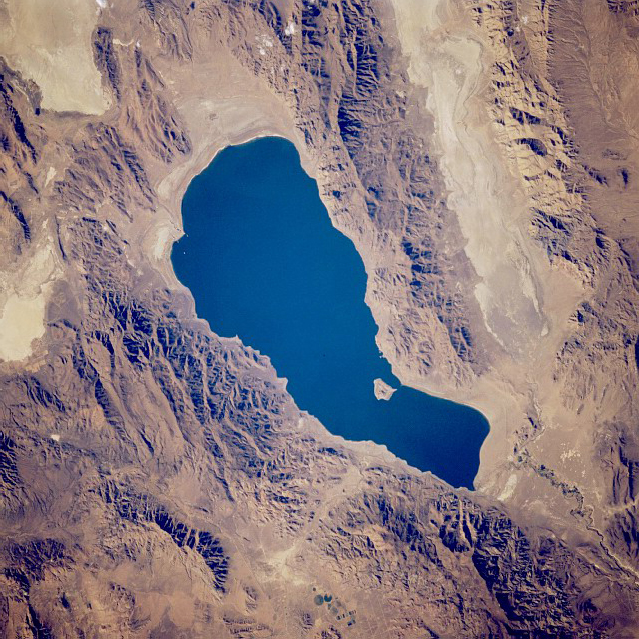
Satellite photo of Pyramid Lake, September 1994

Impetus to derive a quantitative prediction model arose from a trend of historically decreasing river flow rates coupled with jurisdictional and tribal conflicts over water rights as well as concern for river biota. When expansion of the Reno-Sparks Wastewater Treatment Plant was proposed, the EPA decided to fund a large scale research effort to create simulation software and a parallel program to collect field data in the Truckee River and Pyramid Lake. For river stations water quality measurements were made in the benthic zone as well as the topic zone; in the case of Pyramid Lake boats were used to collect grab samples at varying depths and locations. Earth Metrics conducted the software development for the first generation computer model and collected field data on water quality and flow rates in the Truckee River. After model calibration, runs were made to evaluate impacts of alternative land use controls and discharge parameters for treated effluent.

The DSSAM Model is constructed to allow dynamic decay of most pollutants; for example, total nitrogen and phosphorus are allowed to be consumed by benthic algae in each time step, and the algal communities are given a separate population dynamic in each river reach (e.g.metabolic rate based upon river temperature). Sources throughout the watershed include non-point agricultural and urban stormwater as well as a multiplicity of point source discharges of treated municipal wastewater effluent.

Subsequent to the first generation of DSSAM model development, calibration and application, later refinements were made. These augmentations to model functionality focussed on increased flexibility in modeling the diel cycle and also allowed inclusion of analyzing particulate nitrogen and phosphorus. In developing DSSAM III several changes in the model operation and scope were performed.

== Applications ==
Numerous different uses of the model have been made including (a)analysis of public policies for urban stormwater runoff, (b) researching agricultural methods for surface runoff minimization, (c) innovative solutions for non-point source control and d)engineering aspects of treated wastewater discharge. Regarding stormwater runoff in Washoe County, the specific elements within a new xeriscape ordinance were analyzed for efficacy using the model. For the varied agricultural uses in the watershed, the model was run to understand the principal sources of adverse impact, and management practices were developed to reduce in river pollution. Use of the model has specifically been conducted to analyze survival of two endangered species found in the Truckee River and Pyramid Lake: the Cui-ui sucker fish (endangered 1967) and the Lahontan cutthroat trout (threatened 1970). When the model is used for surface runoff reaching a stream, this pollutant input can be viewed as a line source (e.g., a continuous linear source of pollution entering the waterway).

== See also ==
- Nonpoint source pollution
- SWAT model
- Stochastic Empirical Loading and Dilution Model
- Storm Water Management Model
