= Antecedent =

Antecedent may refer to:

== Science ==
- Antecedent (behavioral psychology), the stimulus that occurs before a trained behavior
- Antecedent (genealogy), antonym of descendant, genealogical predecessor in family line
- Antecedent (logic), the first half of a hypothetical proposition
- Antecedent moisture, in hydrology, the relative wetness condition of a catchment

== Language ==
- Antecedent (grammar), the previously occurring noun phrase to which a pro-form refers
- Generic antecedent, representatives of classes, referred to in ordinary language by another word

== Other uses ==
- Antecedent (law), the history of a defendant
- Antecedent phrase, in music
