= Routing (hydrology) =

Hydrologic technique

In hydrology, routing is a technique used to predict the changes in shape of a hydrograph as water moves through a river channel or a reservoir. In flood forecasting, hydrologists may want to know how a short burst of intense rain in an area upstream of a city will change as it reaches the city. Routing can be used to determine whether the pulse of rain reaches the city as a deluge or a trickle.

Routing also can be used to predict the hydrograph shape (and thus lowland flooding potential) subsequent to multiple rainfall events in different sub-catchments of the watershed. Timing and duration of the rainfall events, as well as factors such as antecedent moisture conditions, overall watershed shape, along with subcatchment-area shapes, land slopes (topography/physiography), geology/hydrogeology (i.e. forests and aquifers can serve as giant sponges that absorb rainfall and slowly release it over subsequent weeks and months), and stream-reach lengths all play a role here. The result can be an additive effect (i.e. a large flood if each subcatchment's respective hydrograph peak arrives at the watershed mouth at the same point in time, thereby effectively causing a "stacking" of the hydrograph peaks), or a more distributed-in-time effect (i.e. a lengthy but relatively modest flood, effectively attenuated in time, as the individual subcatchment peaks arrive at the mouth of the main watershed channel in orderly succession).

Other uses of routing include reservoir and channel design, floodplain studies and watershed simulations.

If the water flow at a particular point, A, in a stream is measured over time with a flow gauge, this information can be used to create a hydrograph. A short period of intense rain, normally called a flood event, can cause a bulge in the graph, as the increased water travels down the river, reaches the flow gauge at A, and passes along it. If another flow gauge at B, downstream of A is set up, one would expect the graph's bulge (or floodwave) to have the same shape. However, the shape of the river and flow resistance within a river (from the river bed, for example) can affect the shape of the floodwave. Oftentimes, the floodwave will be attenuated (have a reduced peak flow).

Routing techniques can be broadly classified as hydraulic (or distributed) routing, hydrologic (or lumped) routing or semi-distributed routing. In general, based on the available field data and goals of the project, one of routing procedures is selected.

== Hydraulic (or distributed) routing ==
Hydraulic routing is based on the solution of partial differential equations of unsteady open-channel flow. The equations used are the Saint-Venant equations or the associated dynamic wave equations.

The hydraulic models (e.g. dynamic and diffusion wave models) require the gathering of a lot of data related to river geometry and morphology and consume a lot of computer resources in order to solve the equations numerically.

== Hydrologic (or lumped) routing ==
Hydrologic routing uses the continuity equation for hydrology. In its simplest form, inflow to the river reach is equal to the outflow of the river reach plus the change of storage:

$I = O + \frac{\Delta S}{\Delta t}$, where

- I is average inflow to the reach during $\Delta t$
- O is average outflow from the reach during $\Delta t$; and
- S is the water currently in the reach (known as storage)

The hydrologic models (e.g. linear and nonlinear Muskingum models) need to estimate hydrologic parameters using recorded data in both upstream and downstream sections of rivers and/or by applying robust optimization techniques to solve the one-dimensional conservation of mass and storage-continuity equation.

== Semi-distributed routing ==
Semi-distributed models such as Muskingum–Cunge family procedures are also available. Simple physical concepts and common river characteristics such as channel geometry, reach length, roughness coefficient, and slope are used to estimate the model parameters without complex and expensive numerical solutions.

== Flood routing ==
Flood routing is a procedure to determine the time and magnitude of flow (i.e., the flow hydrograph) at a point on a watercourse from known or assumed hydrographs at one or more points upstream. The procedure is specifically known as Flood routing, if the flow is a flood. After Routing, the peak gets attenuated & a time lag is introduced. In order to determine the change in shape of a hydrograph of a flood as it travels through a natural river or artificial channel, different flood simulation techniques can be used. Traditionally, the hydraulic (e.g. dynamic and diffusion wave models) and hydrologic (e.g. linear and nonlinear Muskingum models) routing procedures that are well known as distributed and lumped ways to hydraulic and hydrologic practitioners, respectively, can be utilized. The hydrologic models need to estimate hydrologic parameters using recorded data in both upstream and downstream sections of rivers and/or by applying robust optimization techniques to solve the one-dimensional conservation of mass and storage-continuity equation. On the other hand, hydraulic models require the gathering of a lot of data related to river geometry and morphology and consume a lot of computer resources in order to solve the equations numerically. However, semi-distributed models such as Muskingum–Cunge family procedures are also available. Simple physical concepts and common river characteristic consisting of channel geometry, reach length, roughness coefficient, and slope are used to estimate the model parameters without complex and expensive numerical solutions. In general, based on the available field data and goals of a project, one of these approaches is utilized for the simulation of flooding in rivers and channels.

== Runoff Routing ==
Runoff routing is a procedure to calculate a surface runoff hydrograph from rainfall. Losses are removed from rainfall to determine the rainfall excess which is then converted to a hydrograph and routed through conceptual storages that represent the storage discharge behaviour of overland and channel flow.

== See also ==
- Hydrograph
- One-dimensional Saint-Venant equations
