= Storm Water Management Model =

Rainfall-runoff-subsurface runoff simulation model

The United States Environmental Protection Agency (EPA) Storm Water Management Model (SWMM) is a dynamic rainfall–runoff–subsurface runoff simulation model used for single-event to long-term (continuous) simulation of the surface/subsurface hydrology quantity and quality from primarily urban/suburban areas.

It can simulate the rainfall-runoff, runoff, evaporation, infiltration and groundwater connection for roots, streets, grassed areas, rain gardens and ditches and pipes, for example. The hydrology component of SWMM operates on a collection of subcatchment areas divided into impervious and pervious areas with and without depression storage to predict runoff and pollutant loads from precipitation, evaporation and infiltration losses from each of the subcatchment. Besides, low impact development (LID) and best management practice areas on the subcatchment can be modeled to reduce the impervious and pervious runoff. The routing or hydraulics section of SWMM transports this water and possible associated water quality constituents through a system of closed pipes, open channels, storage/treatment devices, ponds, storages, pumps, orifices, weirs, outlets, outfalls and other regulators.

SWMM tracks the quantity and quality of the flow generated within each subcatchment, and the flow rate, flow depth, and quality of water in each pipe and channel during a simulation period composed of multiple fixed or variable time steps. The water quality constituents such as water quality constituents can be simulated from buildup on the subcatchments through washoff to a hydraulic network with optional first order decay and linked pollutant removal, best management practice and low-impact development (LID) removal and treatment can be simulated at selected storage nodes. SWMM is one of the hydrology transport models which the EPA and other agencies have applied widely throughout North America and through consultants and universities throughout the world. The latest update notes and new features can be found on the EPA website in the download section. Recently added in November 2015 were the EPA SWMM 5.1 Hydrology Manual (Volume I) and in 2016 the EPA SWMM 5.1 Hydraulic Manual (Volume II) and EPA SWMM 5.1 Water Quality (including LID Modules) Volume (III) + Errata.

== Program description ==
The EPA storm water management model (SWMM) is a dynamic rainfall-runoff-routing simulation model used for single event or long-term (continuous) simulation of runoff quantity and quality from primarily urban areas. The runoff component of SWMM operates on a collection of subcatchment areas that receive precipitation and generate runoff and pollutant loads. The routing portion of SWMM transports this runoff through a system of pipes, channels, storage/treatment devices, pumps, and regulators. SWMM tracks the quantity and quality of runoff generated within each subcatchment, and the flow rate, flow depth, and quality of water in each pipe and channel during a simulation period divided into multiple time steps.

SWMM accounts for various hydrologic processes that produce runoff from urban areas. These include:

1. time-varying rainfall
2. evaporation of standing surface water
3. snow accumulation and melting
4. rainfall interception from depression storage
5. infiltration of rainfall into unsaturated soil layers
6. percolation of infiltrated water into groundwater layers
7. interflow between groundwater and the drainage system
8. nonlinear reservoir routing of overland flow
9. capture and retention of rainfall/runoff with various types of low impact development (LID) practices.

SWMM also contains a flexible set of hydraulic modeling capabilities used to route runoff and external inflows through the drainage system network of pipes, channels, storage/treatment units and diversion structures. These include the ability to:

1. handle networks of unlimited size·
2. use a wide variety of standard closed and open conduit shapes as well as natural channels·
3. model special elements such as storage/treatment units, flow dividers, pumps, weirs, and orifices·
4. apply external flows and water quality inputs from surface runoff, groundwater interflow, rainfall-dependent infiltration/inflow, dry weather sanitary flow, and user-defined inflows
5. utilize either kinematic wave or full dynamic wave flow routing methods·
6. model various flow regimes, such as backwater, surcharging, reverse flow, and surface ponding·
7. apply user-defined dynamic control rules to simulate the operation of pumps, orifice openings, and weir crest levels.

Spatial variability in all of these processes is achieved by dividing a study area into a collection of smaller, homogeneous subcatchment areas, each containing its own fraction of pervious and impervious sub-areas. Overland flow can be routed between sub-areas, between subcatchments, or between entry points of a drainage system.

Since its inception, SWMM has been used in thousands of sewer and stormwater studies throughout the world. Typical applications include:

1. design and sizing of drainage system components for flood control
2. sizing of detention facilities and their appurtenances for flood control and water quality protection·
3. flood plain mapping of natural channel systems, by modeling the river hydraulics and associated flooding problems using prismatic channels·
4. designing control strategies for minimizing Combined Sewer Overflow (CSO) and Sanitary Sewer Overflow (SSO)·
5. evaluating the impact of inflow and infiltration on sanitary sewer overflows·
6. generating non-point source pollutant loadings for waste load allocation studies·
7. evaluating the effectiveness of BMPs and subcatchment LID's for reducing wet weather pollutant loadings. Rainfall-runoff modeling of urban and rural watersheds
8. hydraulic and water quality analysis of storm, sanitary, and combined sewer systems
9. master planning of sewer collection systems and urban watersheds
10. system evaluations associated with USEPA's regulations including NPDES permits, CMOM, and TMDL
11. 1D and 2D (surface ponding) predictions of flood levels and flooding volume

EPA SWMM is public domain software that may be freely copied and distributed. The SWMM 5 public domain consists of C engine code and Delphi SWMM 5 graphical user interface code. The C code and Delphi code are easily edited and can be recompiled by students and professionals for custom features or extra output features.

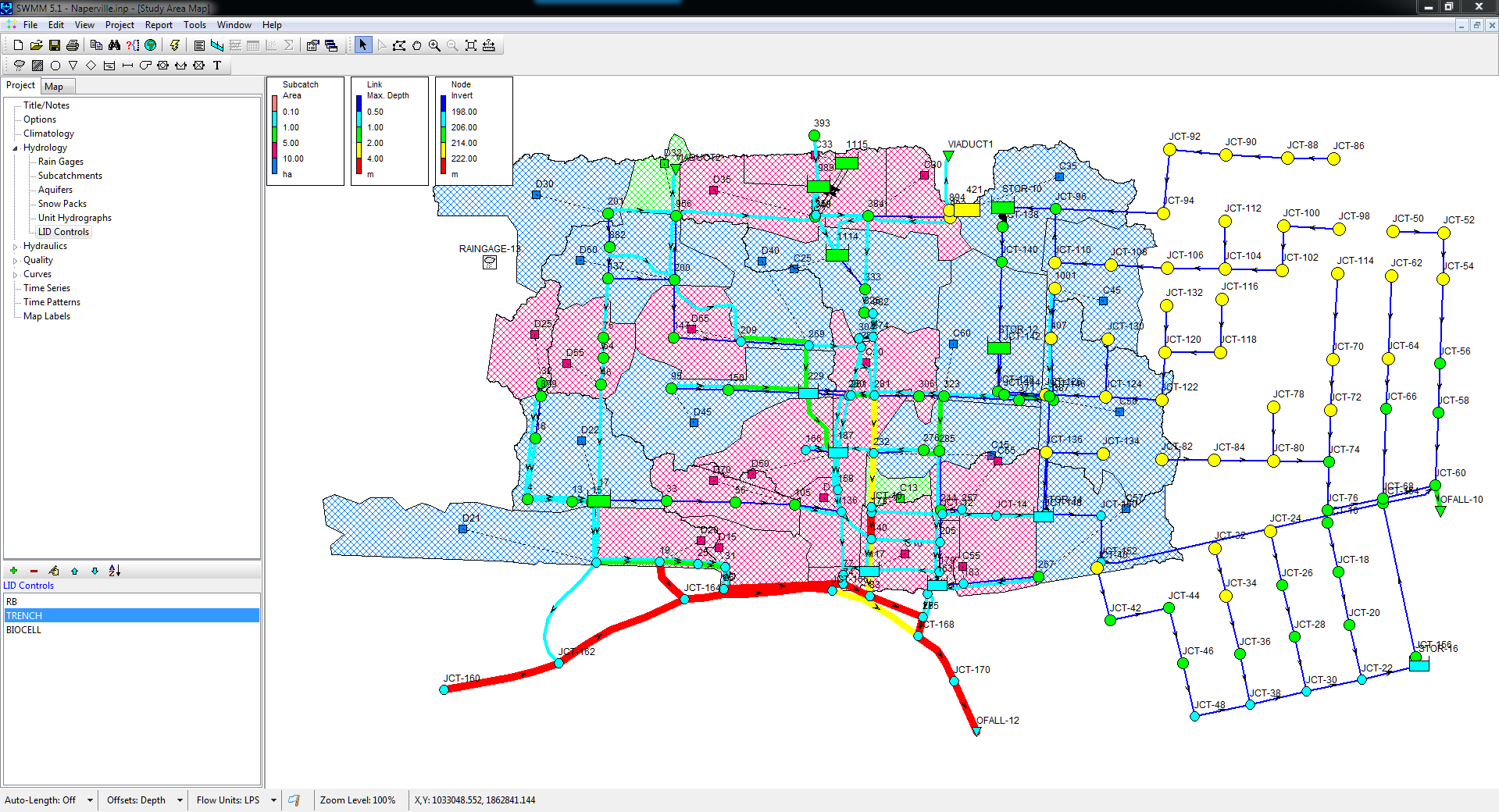
Figure 1. SWMM 5 Model Simulation GUI

== History ==
SWMM was first developed between 1969–1971 and has undergone four major upgrades since those years. The major upgrades were: (1) Version 2 in 1973-1975, (2) Version 3 in 1979-1981, (3) Version 4 in 1985-1988 and (4) Version 5 in 2001-2004. A list of the major changes and post-2004 changes are shown in Table 1. The current SWMM edition is Version 5.2.4. SWMM5 is a complete rewrite of the previous Fortran releases, written in C, and runs on Windows and can be compiled for Unix-like operating systems. The code for SWMM5 is open source and public domain code that can be downloaded from the EPA website.

EPA SWMM 5 provides an integrated graphical environment for editing watershed input data, running hydrologic, hydraulic, real time control and water quality simulations, and viewing the results in a variety of graphical formats. These include color-coded thematic drainage area maps, time series graphs and tables, profile plots, scatter plots and statistical frequency analyses.

The last rewrite of EPA SWMM was produced by the Water Supply and Water Resources Division of the U.S. Environmental Protection Agency's National Risk Management Research Laboratory with assistance from the consulting firm of CDM Inc under a Cooperative Research and Development Agreement (CRADA). SWMM 5 is used as the computational engine for many modeling packages plus components of SWMM5 are in other modeling packages. The major modeling packages that use all or some of the SWMM5 components are shown in the Vendor section. The update history of SWMM 5 from the original SWMM 5.0.001 to the current version SWMM 5.2.4 can be found at the EPA website. SWMM 5 was approved FEMA Model Approval Page in May 2005, with a note about the versions that are approved on the FEMA Approval Page SWMM 5 Version 5.0.005 (May 2005) and up for NFIP modeling. SWMM 5 is used as the computational engine for many modeling packages (see the SWMM 5 Platform Section of this article) and some components of SWMM5 are in other modeling packages (see the SWMM 5 Vendor Section of this article).

In 2026 the HydroCouple project began publishing an open-source continuation of the EPA SWMM 5 engine, released as Open-Source SWMM 6.0.0 under the Apache 2.0 license and developed independently of the EPA. Its first development builds appeared in May 2026 and its first alpha releases in July 2026. The new engine keeps the SWMM 5 solver available and adds two-dimensional finite-volume surface routing and a semi-implicit node continuity option for dynamic-wave routing.

Table 1. EPASWMM History
Release date	Versions	Developers	FEMA Approval	LID Controls	Major Release
08/07/2023	SWMM 5.2.4	EPA	Yes	Yes
03/03/2023	SWMM 5.2.3	EPA	Yes	Yes
12/01/2022	SWMM 5.2.2	EPA	Yes	Yes
08/11/2022	SWMM 5.2.1	EPA	Yes	Yes
02/01/2022	SWMM 5.2	EPA	Yes	Yes	Yes
07/20/2020	SWMM 5.1.015	EPA	Yes	Yes
02/18/2020	SWMM 5.1.014	EPA	Yes	Yes	Yes
08/09/2018	SWMM 5.1.013	EPA	Yes	Yes	Yes
03/14/2017	SWMM 5.1.012	EPA	Yes	Yes	Yes
08/22/2016	SWMM 5.1.011	EPA	Yes	Yes	Yes
08/20/2015	SWMM 5.1.010	EPA	Yes	Yes	Yes
04/30/2015	SWMM 5.1.009	EPA	Yes	Yes	Yes
04/17/2015	SWMM 5.1.008	EPA	Yes	Yes
10/09/2014	SWMM 5.1.007	EPA	Yes	Yes
06/02/2014	SWMM 5.1.006	EPA	Yes	Yes
03/27/2014	SWMM 5.1.001	EPA	Yes	Yes
04/21/2011	SWMM 5.0.022	EPA	Yes	Yes
08/20/2010	SWMM 5.0.019	EPA	Yes	Yes
03/19/2008	SWMM 5.0.013	EPA	Yes	Yes
08/17/2005	SWMM 5.0.005	EPA, CDM	Yes	No
11/30/2004	SWMM 5.0.004	EPA, CDM	No	No
11/25/2004	SWMM 5.0.003	EPA, CDM	No	No
10/26/2004	SWMM 5.0.001	EPA, CDM	No	No
2001–2004	SWMM5	EPA, CDM	No	No
1988–2004	SWMM4	UF, OSU, CDM	No	No
1981–1988	SWMM3	UF, CDM	No	No
1975–1981	SWMM2	UF	No	No
1969–1971	SWMM1	UF, CDM, M&E	No	No

== SWMM conceptual model ==
SWMM conceptualizes a drainage system as a series of water and material flows between several major environmental compartments. These compartments and the SWMM objects they contain include:

The atmosphere compartment, from which precipitation falls and pollutants are deposited onto the land surface compartment. SWMM uses Rain Gage objects to represent rainfall inputs to the system. The rain gage objects can use time series, external text files or NOAA rainfall data files. The Rain Gage objects can use precipitation for thousands of years. Using the SWMM-CAT Addon to SWMM5 climate change can now be simulated using modified temperature, evaporation or rainfall.

The Land Surface compartment, which is represented by one or more subcatchment objects. It receives precipitation from the Atmospheric compartment in the form of rain or snow; it sends outflow in the form of infiltration to the groundwater compartment and also as surface runoff and pollutant loadings to the Transport compartment. The low impact development (LID) controls are part of the subcatchments and store, infiltrate or evaporate the runoff.

The groundwater compartment receives infiltration from the Land Surface compartment and transfers a portion of this inflow to the transport compartment. This compartment is modeled using aquifer objects. The connection to the Transport compartment can be either a static boundary or a dynamic depth in the channels. The links in the Transport compartment now also have seepage and evaporation.

The transport compartment contains a network of conveyance elements (channels, pipes, pumps, and regulators) and storage/treatment units that transport water to outfalls or to treatment facilities. Inflows to this compartment can come from surface runoff, groundwater interflow, sanitary dry weather flow, or from user-defined hydrographs. The components of the Transport compartment are modeled with Node and Link objects.

Not all compartments need to appear in a particular SWMM model. For example, one could model just the transport compartment, using pre-defined hydrographs as inputs. If kinematic wave routing is used, then the nodes do not need to contain an outfall.

== Model parameters ==
The simulated model parameters for subcatchments are surface roughness, depression storage, slope, flow path length; for Infiltration: Horton: max/min rates and decay constant; Green-Ampt: hydraulic conductivity, initial moisture deficit and suction head; Curve Number: NRCS (SCS) Curve number; All: time for saturated soil to fully drain; for Conduits: Manning’s roughness; for Water Quality: buildup/washoff function coefficients, first-order decay coefficients, removal equations. A study area can be divided into any number of individual subcatchments, each of which drains to a single point. Study areas can range in size from a small portion of a single lot up to thousands of acres. SWMM uses hourly or more frequent rainfall data as input and can be run for single events or in a continuous fashion for any number of years.

== Hydrology and hydraulics capabilities ==
SWMM 5 accounts for various hydrologic processes that produce surface and subsurface runoff from urban areas. These include:

1. Time-varying rainfall for an unlimited number of rain gages for both design and continuous hyetographs
2. evaporation of standing surface water on watersheds and surface ponds
3. snowfall accumulation, plowing, and melting
4. rainfall interception from depression storage in both impervious and pervious areas
5. infiltration of precipitation into unsaturated soil layers
6. percolation of infiltrated water into groundwater layers
7. interflow between groundwater and pipes and ditches
8. nonlinear reservoir routing of watershed overland flow.

Spatial variability in all of these processes is achieved by dividing a study area into a collection of smaller, homogeneous watershed or subcatchment areas, each containing its fraction of pervious and impervious sub-areas. Overland flow can be routed between sub-areas, between subcatchments, or between entry points of a drainage system.

SWMM also contains a flexible set of hydraulic modeling capabilities used to route runoff and external inflows through the drainage system network of pipes, channels, storage/treatment units and diversion structures. These include the ability to:

1. Simulate drainage networks of unlimited size
2. use a wide variety of standard closed and open conduit shapes as well as natural or irregular channels
3. model special elements such as storage/treatment units, outlets, flow dividers, pumps, weirs, and orifices
4. apply external flows and water quality inputs from surface runoff, groundwater interflow, rainfall-dependent infiltration/inflow, dry weather sanitary flow, and user-defined inflows
5. utilize either steady, kinematic wave or full dynamic wave flow routing methods
6. model various flow regimes, such as backwater, surcharging, pressure, reverse flow, and surface ponding
7. apply user-defined dynamic control rules to simulate the operation of pumps, orifice openings, and weir crest levels

Infiltration is the process of rainfall penetrating the ground surface into the unsaturated soil zone of pervious subcatchments areas. SWMM5 offers four choices for modeling infiltration:

=== Classical infiltration method ===
This method is based on empirical observations showing that infiltration decreases exponentially from an initial maximum rate to some minimum rate over the course of a long rainfall event. Input parameters required by this method include the maximum and minimum infiltration rates, a decay coefficient that describes how fast the rate decreases over time, and the time it takes a fully saturated soil to completely dry (used to compute the recovery of infiltration rate during dry periods).

Figure 2. SWMM 5's QA/QC Master Example Network. This one network includes examples 1 through 7 from the SWMM 3 and SWMM 4 Manuals

==== Modified Horton Method ====
This is a modified version of the classical Horton Method that uses the cumulative infiltration in excess of the minimum rate as its state variable (instead of time along the Horton curve), providing a more accurate infiltration estimate when low rainfall intensities occur. It uses the same input parameters as does the traditional Horton Method.

=== Green–Ampt method ===
This method for modeling infiltration assumes that a sharp wetting front exists in the soil column, separating soil with some initial moisture content below from saturated soil above. The input parameters required are the initial moisture deficit of the soil, the soil's hydraulic conductivity, and the suction head at the wetting front. The recovery rate of moisture deficit during dry periods is empirically related to the hydraulic conductivity.

=== Curve number method ===
This approach is adopted from the NRCS (SCS) curve number method for estimating runoff. It assumes that the total infiltration capacity of a soil can be found from the soil's tabulated curve number. During a rain event this capacity is depleted as a function of cumulative rainfall and remaining capacity. The input parameters for this method are the curve number and the time it takes a fully saturated soil to completely dry (used to compute the recovery of infiltration capacity during dry periods).

SWMM also allows the infiltration recovery rate to be adjusted by a fixed amount on a monthly basis to account for seasonal variation in such factors as evaporation rates and groundwater levels. This optional monthly soil recovery pattern is specified as part of a project's evaporation data.

In addition to modeling the generation and transport of runoff flows, SWMM can also estimate the production of pollutant loads associated with this runoff. The following processes can be modeled for any number of user-defined water quality constituents:

1. Dry-weather pollutant buildup over different land uses
2. pollutant washoff from specific land uses during storm events
3. direct contribution of wet and dry rainfall deposition
4. reduction in dry-weather buildup due to street cleaning
5. reduction in washoff load due to BMPs and LIDs
6. entry of dry weather sanitary flows and user-specified external inflows at any point in the drainage system
7. routing of water quality constituents through the drainage system
8. reduction in constituent concentration through treatment in storage units or by natural processes in pipes and channels.

Rain gages in SWMM5 supply precipitation data for one or more subcatchment areas in a study region. The rainfall data can be either a user-defined time series or come from an external file. Several different popular rainfall file formats currently in use are supported, as well as a standard user-defined format. The principal input properties of rain gages include:

1. rainfall data type (e.g., intensity, volume, or cumulative volume)
2. recording time interval (e.g., hourly, 15-minute, etc.)
3. source of rainfall data (input time series or external file)
4. name of rainfall data source

The other principal input parameters for the subcatchments include:

1. assigned rain gage
2. outlet node or subcatchment and routing fraction
3. assigned land uses
4. tributary surface area
5. imperviousness and zero percent imperviousness
6. slope
7. characteristic width of overland flow
8. Manning's n for overland flow on both pervious and impervious areas
9. depression storage in both pervious and impervious areas
10. percent of impervious area with no depression storage.
11. infiltration parameters
12. snowpack
13. groundwater parameters
14. LID parameters for each LID Control Used

== Routing options ==
Steady-flow routing represents the simplest type of routing possible (actually no routing) by assuming that within each computational time step flow is uniform and steady. Thus it simply translates inflow hydrographs at the upstream end of the conduit to the downstream end, with no delay or change in shape. The normal flow equation is used to relate flow rate to flow area (or depth).

This type of routing cannot account for channel storage, backwater effects, entrance/exit losses, flow reversal or pressurized flow. It can only be used with dendritic conveyance networks, where each node has only a single outflow link (unless the node is a divider in which case two outflow links are required). This form of routing is insensitive to the time step employed and is really only appropriate for preliminary analysis using long-term continuous simulations. Kinematic wave routing solves the continuity equation along with a simplified form of the momentum equation in each conduit. The latter requires that the slope of the water surface equal the slope of the conduit.

The maximum flow that can be conveyed through a conduit is the full normal flow value. Any flow in excess of this entering the inlet node is either lost from the system or can pond atop the inlet node and be re-introduced into the conduit as capacity becomes available.

Kinematic wave routing allows flow and area to vary both spatially and temporally within a conduit. This can result in attenuated and delayed outflow hydrographs as inflow is routed through the channel. However this form of routing cannot account for backwater effects, entrance/exit losses, flow reversal, or pressurized flow, and is also restricted to dendritic network layouts. It can usually maintain numerical stability with moderately large time steps, on the order of 1 to 5 minutes. If the aforementioned effects are not expected to be significant then this alternative can be an accurate and efficient routing method, especially for long-term simulations.

Dynamic wave routing solves the complete one-dimensional Saint Venant flow equations and therefore produces the most theoretically accurate results. These equations consist of the continuity and momentum equations for conduits and a volume continuity equation at nodes.

With this form of routing it is possible to represent pressurized flow when a closed conduit becomes full, such that flows can exceed the full normal flow value. Flooding occurs when the water depth at a node exceeds the maximum available depth, and the excess flow is either lost from the system or can pond atop the node and re-enter the drainage system.

Dynamic wave routing can account for channel storage, backwater, entrance/exit losses, flow reversal, and pressurized flow. Because it couples together the solution for both water levels at nodes and flow in conduits it can be applied to any general network layout, even those containing multiple downstream diversions and loops. It is the method of choice for systems subjected to significant backwater effects due to downstream flow restrictions and with flow regulation via weirs and orifices. This generality comes at a price of having to use much smaller time steps, on the order of a minute or less (SWMM can automatically reduce the user-defined maximum time step as needed to maintain numerical stability).

== Integrated hydrology/hydraulics ==
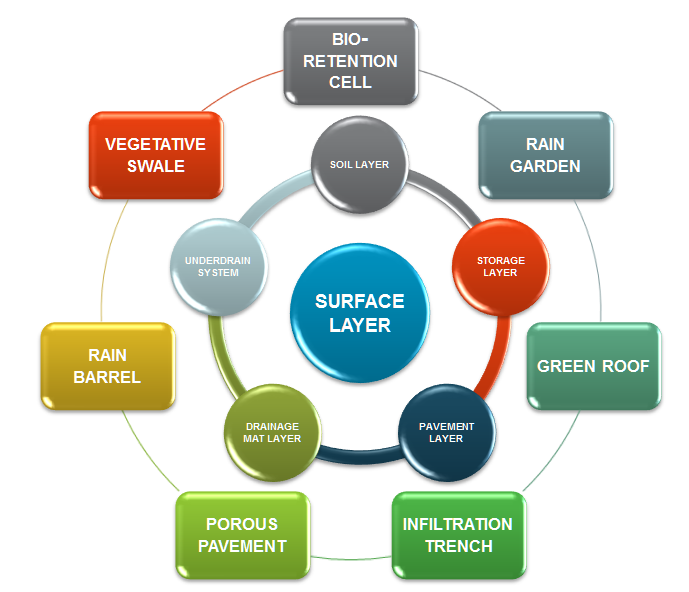
Figure 3. SWMM 5's LID processes include unlimited low-impact development or BMP objects per subcatchment and 5 types of layers.

One of the great advances in SWMM 5 was the integration of urban/suburban subsurface flow with the hydraulic computations of the drainage network. This advance is a tremendous improvement over the separate subsurface hydrologic and hydraulic computations of the previous versions of SWMM because it allows the modeler to conceptually model the same interactions that occur physically in the real open channel/shallow aquifer environment. The SWMM 5 numerical engine calculates the surface runoff, subsurface hydrology and assigns the current climate data at either the wet or dry hydrologic time step. The hydraulic calculations for the links, nodes, control rules and boundary conditions of the network are then computed at either a fixed or variable time step within the hydrologic time step by using interpolation routines and the simulated hydrologic starting and ending values. The versions of SWMM 5 greater than SWMM 5.1.007 allow the modeler to simulate climate changes by globally changing the rainfall, temperature, and evaporation using monthly adjustments.

An example of this integration was the collection of the different SWMM 4 link types in the runoff, transport and Extran blocks to one unified group of closed conduit and open channel link types in SWMM 5 and a collection of node types (Figure 2).

SWMM contains a flexible set of hydraulic modeling capabilities used to route runoff and external inflows through the drainage system network of pipes, channels, storage/treatment units, and diversion structures. These include the ability to do the following:

Handle drainage networks of unlimited size. Use a wide variety of standard closed and open conduit shapes as well as natural channels. Model special elements, such as storage/treatment units, flow dividers, pumps, weirs, and orifices. Apply external flows and water quality inputs from surface runoff, groundwater interflow, rainfall-dependent infiltration/inflow, dry weather sanitary flow, and user-defined inflows. Utilize either kinematic wave or full dynamic wave flow routing methods. Model various flow regimes, such as backwater, surcharging, reverse flow, and surface ponding. apply user-defined dynamic control rules to simulate the operation of pumps, orifice openings, and weir crest levels. Percolation of infiltrated water into groundwater layers. Interflow between groundwater and the drainage system. Nonlinear reservoir routing of overland flow. Runoff reduction via LID controls.

== Low-impact development components ==
The low-impact development (LID) function was new to SWMM 5.0.019/20/21/22 and SWMM 5.1+ It is integrated within the subcatchment and allows further refinement of the overflows, infiltration flow and evaporation in rain barrel, swales, permeable paving, green roof, rain garden, bioretention and infiltration trench. The term low-impact development (Canada/US) is used in Canada and the United States to describe a land planning and engineering design approach to managing stormwater runoff. In recent years many states in the US have adopted LID concepts and standards to enhance their approach to reducing the harmful potential for storm water pollution in new construction projects. LID takes many forms but can generally be thought of as an effort to minimize or prevent concentrated flows of storm water leaving a site. To do this the LID practice suggests that when impervious surfaces (concrete, etc.) are used, they are periodically interrupted by pervious areas which can allow the storm water to infiltrate (soak into the earth)

A variety of sub-processes in each LID can be defined in SWMM5 such as: surface, pavement, soil, storage, drainmat and drain.

Each type of LID has limitations on the type of sub-process allowed by SWMM 5. It has a good report feature and a LID summary report can be in the rpt file and an external report file in which the surface depth can be seen, soil moisture, storage depth, surface inflow, evaporation, surface infiltration, soil percolation, storage infiltration, surface outflow and the LID continuity error. There can be multiple LID's per subcatchment and no issues have been had because of having many complicated LID sub networks and processes inside the Subcatchments of SWMM 5 or any continuity issues not solvable by a smaller wet hydrology time step. The types of SWMM 5 LID compartments are: storage, underdrain, surface, pavement and soil. a bio-retention cell has storage, underdrain and surface compartments. an infiltration trench lid has storage, underdrain and surface compartments. A porous pavement LID has storage, underdrain and pavement compartments. A rain barrel has only storage and underdrain compartments and a vegetative swale LID has a single surface compartment. Each type of LID shares different underlying compartment objects in SWMM 5 which are called layers.

This set of equations can be solved numerically at each runoff time step to determine how an inflow hydrograph to the LID unit is converted into some combination of runoff hydrograph, sub-surface storage, sub-surface drainage, and infiltration into the surrounding native soil. In addition to Street Planters and Green Roofs, the bio-retention model just described can be used to represent Rain Gardens by eliminating the storage layer and also Porous Pavement systems by replacing the soil layer with a pavement layer.

The surface layer of the LID receives both direct rainfall and runon from other areas. It loses water through infiltration into the soil layer below it, by evapotranspiration (ET) of any water stored in depression storage and vegetative capture, and by any surface runoff that might occur. The soil layer contains an amended soil mix that can support vegetative growth. It receives infiltration from the surface layer and loses water through ET and by percolation into the storage layer below it. The storage layer consists of coarse crushed stone or gravel. It receives percolation from the soil zone above it and loses water by either infiltration into the underlying natural soil or by outflow through a perforated pipe underdrain system.

New as of July 2013, the EPA's National Stormwater Calculator is a Windows desktop application that estimates the annual amount of rainwater and frequency of runoff from a specific site anywhere in the United States. Estimates are based on local soil conditions, land cover, and historic rainfall records. The Calculator accesses several national databases that provide soil, topography, rainfall, and evaporation information for the chosen site. The user supplies information about the site's land cover and selects the types of low impact development (LID) controls they would like to use on-site. The LID Control features in SWMM 5.1.013 include the following among types of Green infrastructure:

- StreetPlanter: Bioretention cells are depressions that contain vegetation grown in an engineered soil mixture placed above a gravel drainage bed. They provide storage, infiltration and evaporation of both direct rainfall and runoff captured from surrounding areas. Street planters consist of concrete boxes filled with an engineered soil that supports vegetative growth. Beneath the soil is a gravel bed that provides additional storage. The walls of a planter extend 3 to 12 inches above the soil bed to allow for ponding within the unit. The thickness of the soil growing medium ranges from 6 to 24 inches while gravel beds are 6 to 18 inches in depth. The planter's capture ratio is the ratio of its area to the impervious area whose runoff it captures.

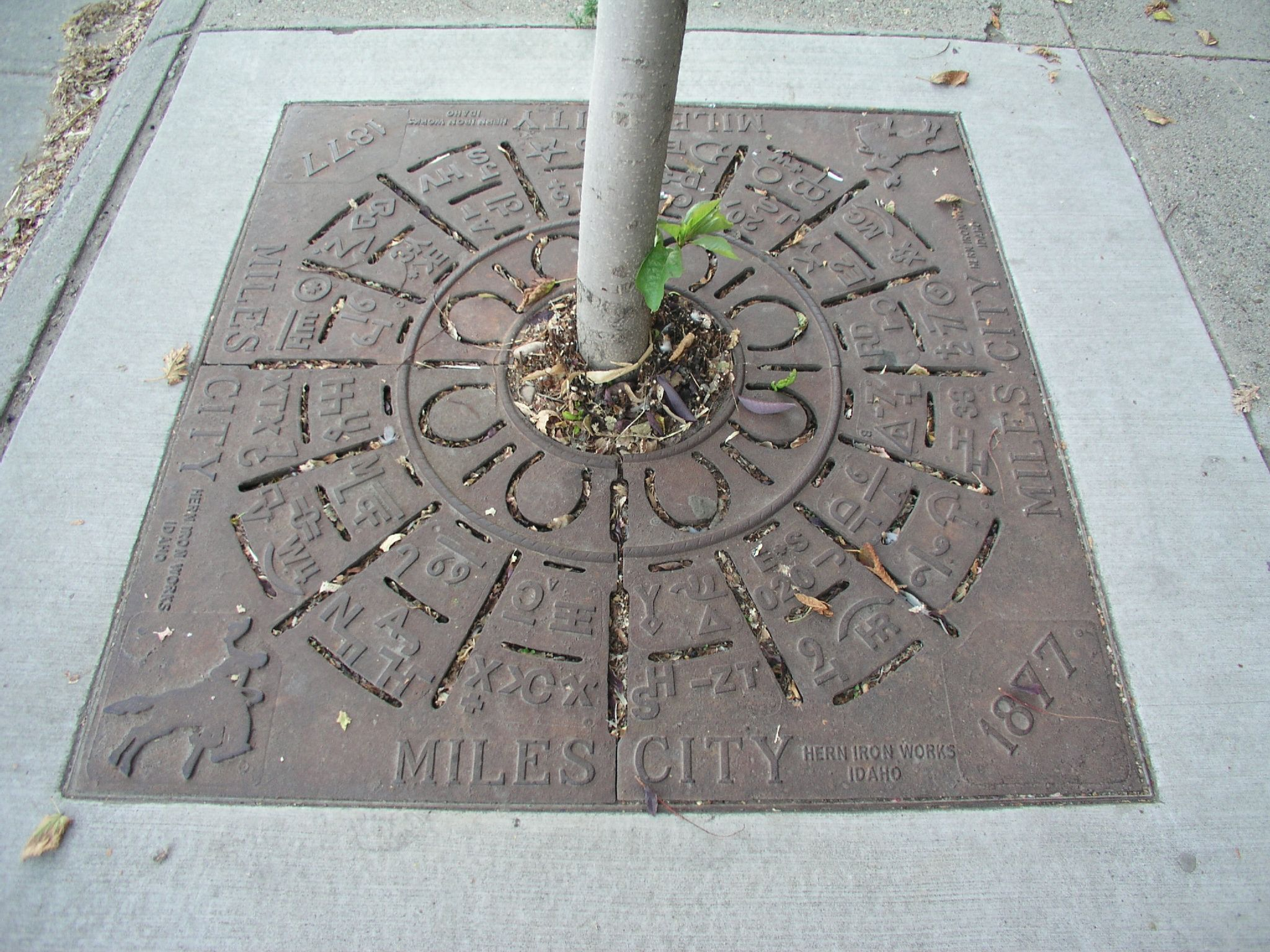
Main Street tree planter in Miles City, Montana

- Raingarden: Rain gardens are a type of bio-retention cell consisting of just the engineered soil layer with no gravel bed below it. Rain Gardens are shallow depressions filled with an engineered soil mix that supports vegetative growth. They are usually used on individual home lots to capture roof runoff. Typical soil depths range from 6 to 18 inches. The capture ratio is the ratio of the rain garden's area to the impervious area that drains onto it.

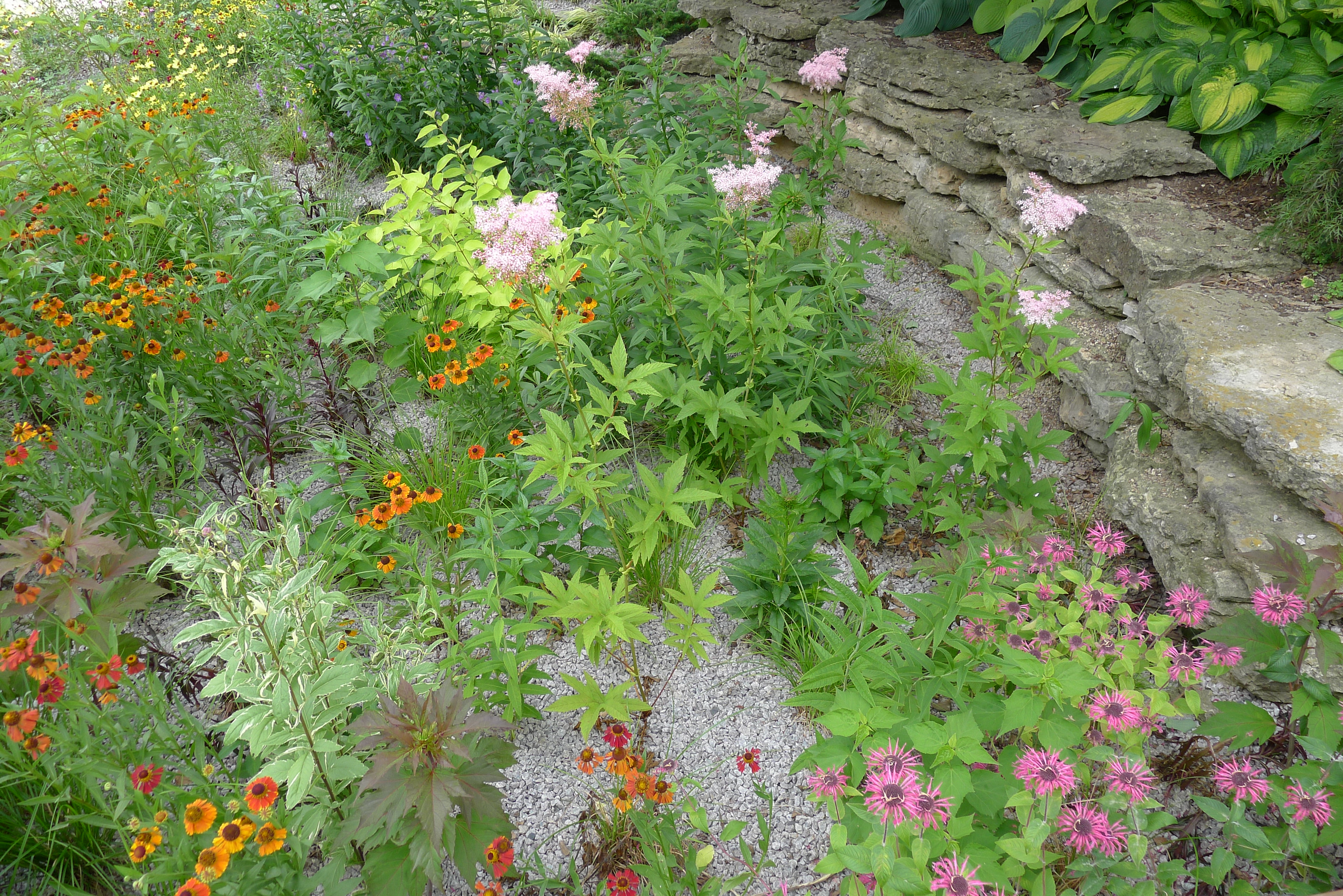
Rain garden in the Allen Centennial Gardens on the campus of the University of Wisconsin-Madison

- GreenRoof: Green roofs are another variation of a bio-retention cell that have a soil layer laying atop a special drainage mat material that conveys excess percolated rainfall off of the roof. Green Roofs (also known as Vegetated Roofs) are bio-retention systems placed on roof surfaces that capture and temporarily store rainwater in a soil growing medium. They consist of a layered system of roofing designed to support plant growth and retain water for plant uptake while preventing ponding on the roof surface. The thickness used for the growing medium typically ranges from 3 to 6 inches.

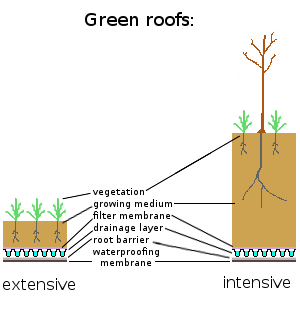
Intensive extensive green roofs

- InfilTrench: infiltration trenches are narrow ditches filled with gravel that intercept runoff from upslope impervious areas. They provide storage volume and additional time for captured runoff to infiltrate the native soil below.

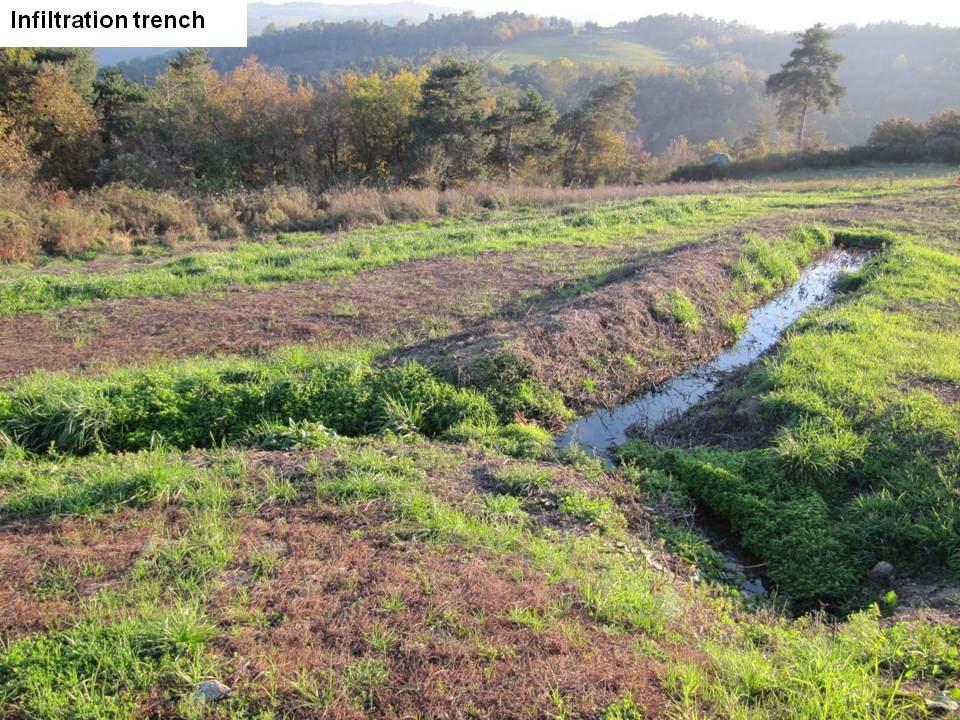
Infiltration trench in France

- PermPave or permeable pavements: Continuous Permeable Pavement systems are excavated areas filled with gravel and paved over with a porous concrete or asphalt mix. Continuous Permeable Pavement systems are excavated areas filled with gravel and paved over with a porous concrete or asphalt mix. Modular Block systems are similar except that permeable block pavers are used instead. Normally all rainfall will immediately pass through the pavement into the gravel storage layer below it where it can infiltrate at natural rates into the site's native soil. Pavement layers are usually 4 to 6 inches in height while the gravel storage layer is typically 6 to 18 inches high. The Capture Ratio is the percent of the treated area (street or parking lot) that is replaced with permeable pavement.
- Cistern: Rain barrels (or cisterns) are containers that collect roof runoff during storm events and can either release or re-use the rainwater during dry periods. Rain harvesting systems collect runoff from rooftops and convey it to a cistern tank where it can be used for non-potable water uses and on-site infiltration. The harvesting system is assumed to consist of a given number of fixed-sized cisterns per 1000 square feet of rooftop area captured. The water from each cistern is withdrawn at a constant rate and is assumed to be consumed or infiltrated entirely on-site.
- VegSwale: Vegetative swales are channels or depressed areas with sloping sides covered with grass and other vegetation. They slow down the conveyance of collected runoff and allow it more time to infiltrate the native soil beneath it. Infiltration basins are shallow depressions filled with grass or other natural vegetation that capture runoff from adjoining areas and allow it to infiltrate into the soil.
- Wet ponds are frequently used for water quality improvement, groundwater recharge, flood protection, aesthetic improvement or any combination of these. Sometimes they act as a replacement for the natural absorption of a forest or other natural process that was lost when an area is developed. As such, these structures are designed to blend into neighborhoods and are viewed as an amenity.
- Dry ponds temporarily store water after a storm, but eventually empties out at a controlled rate to a downstream water body.
- Sand filters generally control runoff water quality, providing very limited flow rate control. A typical sand filter system consists of two or three chambers or basins. The first is the sedimentation chamber, which removes floatables and heavy sediments. The second is the filtration chamber, which removes additional pollutants by filtering the runoff through a sand bed. The third is the discharge chamber. Infiltration trench, is a type of best management practice (BMP) that is used to manage stormwater runoff, prevent flooding and downstream erosion, and improve water quality in an adjacent river, stream, lake or bay. It is a shallow excavated trench filled with gravel or crushed stone that is designed to infiltrate stormwater though permeable soils into the groundwater aquifer.
- A Vegatated filter strip is a type of buffer strip that is an area of vegetation, generally narrow and long, that slows the rate of runoff, allowing sediments, organic matter, and other pollutants that are being conveyed by the water to be removed by settling out. Filter strips reduce erosion and the accompanying stream pollution, and can be a best management practice.

Other LID like concepts around the world include sustainable drainage system (SUDS). The idea behind SUDS is to try to replicate natural systems that use cost effective solutions with low environmental impact to drain away dirty and surface water run-off through collection, storage, and cleaning before allowing it to be released slowly back into the environment, such as into watercourses.

In addition the following features can also be simulated using the features of SWMM 5 (storage ponds, seepage, orifices, Weirs, seepage and evaporation from natural channels): constructed wetlands, wet ponds, dry ponds, infiltration basin, non-surface sand filters, vegetated filterstrips, vegetated filterstrip and infiltration basin. A WetPark would be a combination of wet and dry ponds and LID features. A WetPark is also considered a constructed wetland.

== SWMM5 components ==
The SWMM 5.0.001 to 5.1.022 main components are rain gages, watersheds, LID controls or BMP features such as Wet and Dry Ponds, nodes, links, pollutants, landuses, time patterns, curves, time series, controls, transects, aquifers, unit hydrographs, snowmelt and shapes (Table 3). Other related objects are the types of Nodes and the Link Shapes. The purpose of the objects is to simulate the major components of the hydrologic cycle, the hydraulic components of the drainage, sewer or stormwater network, and the buildup/washoff functions that allow the simulation of water quality constituents. A watershed simulation starts with a precipitation time history. SWMM 5 has many types of open and closed pipes and channels: dummy, circular, filled circular, rectangular closed, rectangular open, trapezoidal, triangular, parabolic, power function, rectangular triangle, rectangle round, modified baskethandle, horizontal ellipse, vertical ellipse, arch, eggshaped, horseshoe, gothic, catenary, semielliptical, baskethandle, semicircular, irregular, custom and force main.

The major objects or hydrology and hydraulic components in SWMM 5 are:

1. GAGE rain gage
2. SUBCATCH subcatchment
3. NODE conveyance system node
4. LINK conveyance system link
5. POLLUT pollutant
6. LANDUSE land use category
7. TIMEPATTERN, dry weather flow time pattern
8. CURVE generic table of values
9. TSERIES generic time series of values
10. CONTROL conveyance system control rules
11. TRANSECT irregular channel cross-section
12. AQUIFER groundwater aquifer
13. UNITHYD RDII unit hydrograph
14. SNOWMELT snowmelt parameter set
15. SHAPE custom conduit shape
16. LID LID treatment units

The major overall components are called in the SWMM 5 input file and C code of the simulation engine: gage, subcatch, node, link, pollute, landuse, timepattern, curve, tseries, control, transect, aquifer, unithyd, snowmelt, shape and lid. The subsets of possible nodes are: junction, outfall, storage and divider. Storage Nodes are either tabular with a depth/area table or a functional relationship between area and depth. Possible node inflows include: external_inflow, dry_weather_inflow, wet_weather_inflow, groundwater_inflow, rdii_inflow, flow_inflow, concen_inflow, and mass_inflow. The dry weather inflows can include the possible patterns: monthly_pattern, daily_pattern, hourly_pattern, and weekend_pattern.

The SWMM 5 component structure allows the user to choose which major hydrology and hydraulic components are used during the simulation:

1. Rainfall/runoff with infiltration options: horton, modified horton, green ampt and curve number
2. RDII
3. Water Quality
4. Groundwater
5. Snowmelt
6. Flow Routing with Routing Options: Steady State, Kinematic Wave and Dynamic Wave

== SWMM 3 and 4 to 5 converter ==
The SWMM 3 and SWMM 4 converter can convert up to two files from the earlier SWMM 3 and 4 versions at one time to SWMM 5. Typically one would convert a Runoff and Transport file to SWMM 5 or a Runoff and Extran File to SWMM 5. If there is a combination of a SWMM 4 Runoff, Transport and Extran network then it will have to be converted in pieces and the two data sets will have to be copied and pasted together to make one SWMM 5 data set. The x,y coordinate file is only necessary if there are not existing x, y coordinates on the D1 line of the SWMM 4 Extran input data[ set. The command File=>Define Ini File can be used to define the location of the ini file. The ini file will save the conversion project input data files and directories.

The SWMMM3 and SWMM 3.5 files are fixed format. The SWMM 4 files are free format. The converter will detect which version of SWMM is being used. The converted files can be combined using a text editor to merge the created inp files.

== SWMM-CAT Climate Change AddOn ==
The Storm Water Management Model Climate Adjustment Tool (SWMM-CAT) is a new addition to SWMM5 (December 2014). It is a simple to use software utility that allows future climate change projections to be incorporated into the Storm Water Management Model (SWMM). SWMM was recently updated to accept a set of monthly adjustment factors for each of these time series that could represent the impact of future changes in climatic conditions. SWMM-CAT provides a set of location-specific adjustments that derived from global climate change models run as part of the World Climate Research Programme (WCRP) Coupled Model Intercomparison Project Phase 3 (CMIP3) archive (Figure 4). SWMM-CAT is a utility that adds location-specific climate change adjustments to a Storm Water Management Model (SWMM) project file. Adjustments can be applied on a monthly basis to air temperature, evaporation rates, and precipitation, as well as to the 24-hour design storm at different recurrence intervals. The source of these adjustments are global climate change models run as part of the World Climate Research Programme (WCRP) Coupled Model Intercomparison Project Phase 3 (CMIP3) archive. Downscaled results from this archive were generated and converted into changes with respect to historical values by USEPA's CREAT project.

The following steps are used to select a set of adjustments to apply to SWMM5:

1) Enter the latitude and longitude coordinates of the location if available or its 5-digit zip code. SWMM-CAT will display a range of climate change outcomes for the CMIP3 results closest to the location.

2) Select whether to use climate change projections based on either a near-term or far-term projection period. The displayed climate change outcomes will be updated to reflect the chosen choice.

3) Select a climate change outcome to save to SWMM. There are three choices that span the range of outcomes produced by the different global climate models used in the CMIP3 project. The Hot/Dry outcome represents a model whose average temperature change was on the high end and whose average rainfall change was on the lower end of all model projections. The Warm/Wet outcome represents a model whose average temperature change was on the lower end and whose average rainfall change was on the wetter end of the spectrum. The Median outcome is for a model whose temperature and rainfall changes were closest to the median of all models.

4) Click the Save Adjustments to SWMM link to bring up a dialog form that will allow the selection of an existing SWMM project file to save the adjustments to. The form will also allow the selection of which type of adjustments (monthly temperature, evaporation, rainfall, or 24-hour design storm) to save. Conversion of temperature and evaporation units is automatically handled depending on the unit system (US or SI) detected in the SWMM file.

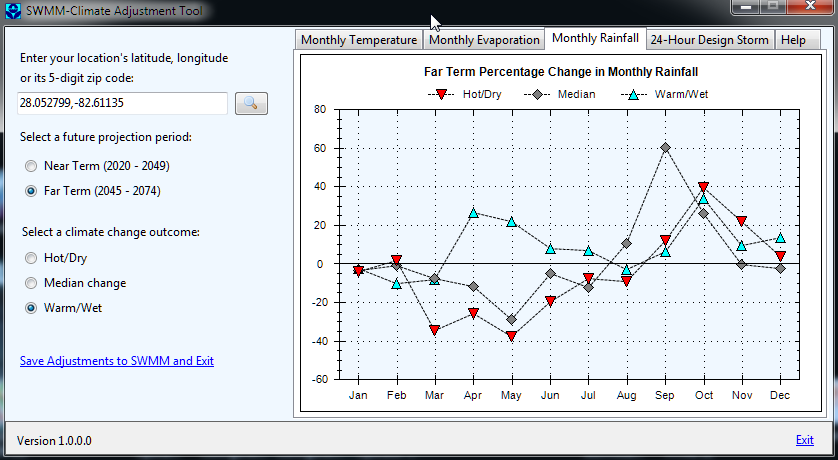
Figure 4. The EPA SWMM5 Climate Change Program

== EPA stormwater calculator based on SWMM5 ==
Other external programs that aid in the generation of data for the EPA SWMM 5 model include: SUSTAIN, BASINS, SSOAP, and the EPA’s National Stormwater Calculator (SWC) which is a desktop application that estimates the annual amount of rainwater and frequency of runoff from a specific site anywhere in the United States (including Puerto Rico). The estimates are based on local soil conditions, land cover, and historic rainfall records (Figure 5).

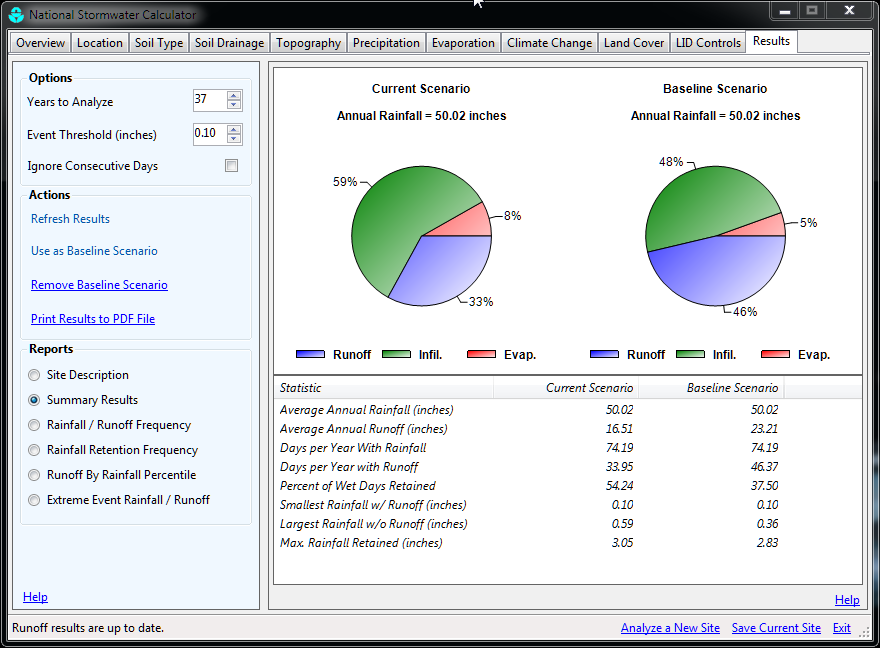
Figure 5. The EPA stormwater calculator for simulating long-term runoff with LID and climate change.

== SWMM platforms ==
The SWMM5 engine is used by a variety of software packages, including many commercial software packages. Some of these software packages include:

- h3O by Aqualyze
- SewerGEMS by Bentley
- StormNET by BOSS
- PCSWMM by CHI
- MIKE URBAN by DHI
- InfoSWMM by Innovyze
- xpswmm by XP Software
- PySWMM by OWA
- GeoSWMM by Utilian

== See also ==
- SWAT model
- Stochastic empirical loading and dilution model – Stormwater quality model
- WAFLEX – Model of rivers
- Hydrology – Science of the movement, distribution, and quality of water on Earth
- Hydraulics – Applied engineering involving liquids
- Surface runoff – Flow of excess rainwater not infiltrating in the ground over its surface
- Precipitation (meteorology) – Condensed water vapor that falls from clouds
- Antecedent moisture
- Evapotranspiration – Natural processes of water movement within the water cycle
- EPANET – Water distribution system modeling software
- Rainfall – Form of precipitation
- Hydrological transport model – Type of mathematical model
- Computer simulation – Process of mathematical modelling, performed on a computer
- Water pollution – Contamination of water bodies
- Water quality – Assessment against standards for use
- Surface-water hydrology – Sub-field of hydrology concerned with above-earth water
