= Antecedent moisture =

In hydrology and sewage collection and disposal, antecedent moisture is the relative wetness or dryness of a watershed or sanitary sewershed. Antecedent moisture conditions change continuously and can have a very significant effect on the flow responses in these systems during wet weather. The effect is evident in most hydrologic systems including stormwater runoff and sanitary sewers with inflow and infiltration. Many modeling and analysis challenges that are created by antecedent moisture conditions are evident within combined sewers and separate sanitary sewer systems.

== Definition ==
The word antecedent simply means "preceding conditions". Combining the terms "antecedent" and "moisture" together means "preceding wetness conditions". Antecedent moisture is the relative wetness or dryness of a sewershed, which changes continuously and can have a very significant effect on the flow responses in these systems during wet weather. Antecedent moisture conditions are high when there has been a lot of recent rainfall and the ground is moist. Antecedent moisture conditions are low when there has been little rainfall and the ground becomes dry.

== Hydrologic basis ==
Rainfall/runoff relationship are well defined within the field of hydrology. Surface runoff in hydrologic systems is generally conceptualized as occurring from pervious and impervious areas. It is the pervious runoff that is affected by antecedent moisture conditions, as runoff from impervious surfaces such as roads, sidewalks, and roofs will not be significantly affected by preceding moisture levels. Pervious surfaces (such as fields, woods, grassed areas, and open areas) are highly affected by antecedent moisture conditions, as they will produce a greater rate of runoff when they are wet than when they are dry.

Rainfall-dependent inflow and infiltration (RDII) into sewer systems is highly affected by antecedent moisture conditions, and these effects can be more complex than the rainfall/runoff relationships for surface water. The travel paths for RDII entering the sewer system are more complex than surface water runoff, because the transport mechanisms include both surface runoff and subsurface transportation. This adds additional complexities to the hydrologic effects and antecedent moisture effects such as the saturation levels of the soils in the subsurface, groundwater levels, and subsurface hydraulics.

Antecedent moisture conditions are highly affected by preceding rainfall levels. However, preceding rainfall is not the only condition that affects antecedent moisture, and many other variables in the hydrologic process can have a significant impact. For example, air temperature, wind speed, and humidity levels affect evaporation rates, which can significantly change antecedent moisture conditions. Additional effects may include evapotranspiration, presence or absence of tree canopy, and snow and ice melting effects.

== Traditional analysis approaches ==
Traditional approaches for analyzing antecedent moisture effects rely on physically-based models derived from first principles, such as the principles of energy, momentum, and continuity, which rely on measurements of many parameters for input and simulation. These include programs such as the Storm Water Management Model, Mouse RDII, or other rainfall/runoff simulation programs. These models are frequently calibrated to a specific antecedent moisture condition observed during a single storm. Fitting data from several storms that occurred during various antecedent moisture conditions requires modifying the model parameters and recalibrating the model. At the end of this process, the modeler is left with several models, each of which can fit a specific storm that occurring during a specific antecedent moisture condition, but none of which are capable of simultaneously fitting all of the data. This is the challenge of using event-based models with traditional approaches: it requires the user to select a particular antecedent moisture condition for design simulations.

Some modeling approaches — such as the Hydrologic Simulation Program - Fortran (HSPF) or the Stanford Watershed Model developed by Crawford and Linsley (1966) — attempt to address antecedent moisture conditions through a complex physically based representation of the transport paths of water on the surface and in the subsurface. These tools have their place in researching and studying the various complexities associated with hydrologic transport processes. However, the great number of parameters in these models, the difficulty of measuring the many parameters, and the sensitivity of the model output to slight variations in the parameters makes using these models to simulate antecedent moisture in sewer systems challenging. Occam's razor provides evidence of these challenges from a systems perspective.

== Data-based approaches ==
An alternative approach for modeling antecedent moisture is to start from measurements of the behavior of the system and the external influences (inputs to the system) and try to determine a mathematical relation between them without going into the details of what is actually happening inside the system. This approach is called system identification. System identification is applied in several fields beyond engineering, ranging from economics to astronomy, and it also comes under other names (such as inverse modeling, time series analysis, and empirical physical modeling). System identification is a general term to describe mathematical tools and algorithms that build dynamical models from measured data. A dynamical model in this context is a mathematical description of the dynamic behavior of a system or process. In many cases, a so-called white-box model based on first principles (e.g., a model for a physical process from Newton's laws of motion) will be overly complex and possibly even impossible to obtain in reasonable time, due to the complex nature of many systems and processes.

Data-based approaches based on system identification, such as the i3D antecedent moisture model, have been applied to hydrologic modeling for simulating antecedent moisture effects on wet weather events in sanitary collection systems. This modeling approach differs from traditional techniques because it is based on system identification and is guided by system observations (i.e. data) and mathematical routines are used to generate the correct model structure, rather than physically based first principles. This is in contrast to assuming that the correct model is known beforehand, as is typically the case for modeling within civil engineering. This technique allows information within the observations to guide the modeling algorithms so that only the relevant and observed dynamics are present in the model structure. The resulting models are not black box, but are grey box models that have parameters and structure that tie directly to physical understanding and interpretation.
