= Antecedent (law) =

Legal term

Antecedents are the life history and previous convictions of a defendant in a criminal case. They are colloquially known as "previous convictions" (or simply "previous") in the United Kingdom and "prior convictions" in the United States and Australia (or simply "priors").

In the UK, when a defendant is being sentenced for a crime, the court will be told antecedents. This information is usually considered by the judge/magistrate in deciding the sentence the defendant will receive. If a defendant pleads "not guilty", previous convictions are not usually made known to the jury during the trial, to prevent prejudice against the defendant, but it is argued if the defendant has previous convictions for similar types of offense, this can be part of the evidence given at the trial.
