= Stochastic empirical loading and dilution model =

Stormwater quality model

The stochastic empirical loading and dilution model (SELDM) is a stormwater quality model. SELDM is designed to transform complex scientific data into meaningful information about the risk of adverse effects of runoff on receiving waters, the potential need for mitigation measures, and the potential effectiveness of such management measures for reducing these risks. The U.S. Geological Survey developed SELDM in cooperation with the Federal Highway Administration to help develop planning-level estimates of event mean concentrations, flows, and loads in stormwater from a site of interest and from an upstream basin. SELDM uses information about a highway site, the associated receiving-water basin, precipitation events, stormflow, water quality, and the performance of mitigation measures to produce a stochastic population of runoff-quality variables. Although SELDM is, nominally, a highway runoff model is can be used to estimate flows concentrations and loads of runoff-quality constituents from other land use areas as well. SELDM was developed by the U.S. Geological Survey so the model, source code, and all related documentation are provided free of any copyright restrictions according to U.S. copyright laws and the USGS Software User Rights Notice. SELDM is widely used to assess the potential effect of runoff from highways, bridges, and developed areas on receiving-water quality with and without the use of mitigation measures. Stormwater practitioners evaluating highway runoff commonly use data from the Highway Runoff Database (HRDB) with SELDM to assess the risks for adverse effects of runoff on receiving waters.

SELDM is a stochastic mass-balance model. A mass-balance approach (figure 1) is commonly applied to estimate the concentrations and loads of water-quality constituents in receiving waters downstream of an urban or highway-runoff outfall. In a mass-balance model, the loads from the upstream basin and runoff source area are added to calculate the discharge, concentration, and load in the receiving water downstream of the discharge point.

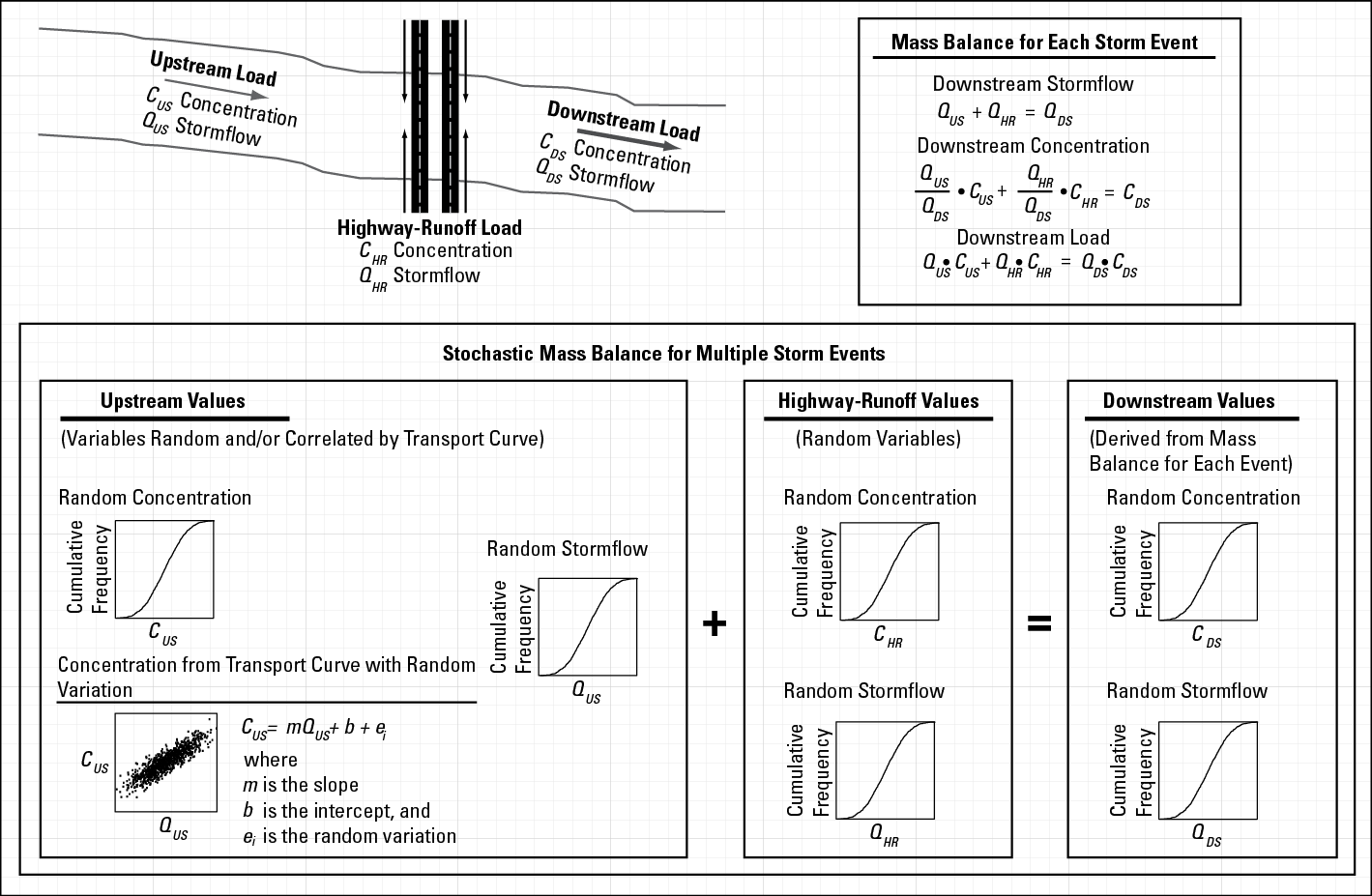
Figure 1. Schematic diagram showing the stochastic mass-balance approach for estimating stormflow, concentration, and loads of water-quality constituents upstream of a highway-runoff outfall, from the highway, and downstream of the outfall

SELDM can do a stream-basin analysis and a lake-basin analysis. The stream-basin analysis uses a stochastic mass-balance analysis based on multi-year simulations including hundreds to thousands of runoff events. SELDM generates storm-event values for the site of interest (the highway site) and the upstream receiving stream to calculate flows, concentrations, and loads in the receiving stream downstream of the stormwater outfall. The lake-basin analysis also is a stochastic multi-year mass-balance analysis. The lake-basin analysis uses the highway loads that occur during runoff periods, the total annual loads from the lake basin to calculate annual loads to and from the lake. The lake basin analysis uses the volume of the lake and pollutant-specific attenuation factors to calculate a population of average-annual lake concentrations.

The annual flows and loads SELDM calculates for the stream and lake analyses also can be used to estimate total maximum daily loads (TMDLs) for the site of interest and the upstream lake basin. The TMDL can be based on the average of annual loads because product of the average load times the number of years of record will be the sum-total load for that (simulated) period of record. The variability in annual values can be used to estimate the risk of exceedance and the margin of safety for the TMDL analysis

== Model description ==
SELDM is a stochastic model because it uses Monte Carlo methods to produce the random combinations of input variable values needed to generate the stochastic population of values for each component variable. SELDM calculates the dilution of runoff in the receiving waters and the resulting downstream event mean concentrations and annual average lake concentrations. Results are ranked, and plotting positions are calculated, to indicate the level of risk of adverse effects caused by runoff concentrations, flows, and loads on receiving waters by storm and by year. Unlike deterministic hydrologic models, SELDM is not calibrated by changing values of input variables to match a historical record of values. Instead, input values for SELDM are based on site characteristics and representative statistics for each hydrologic variable. Thus, SELDM is an empirical model based on data and statistics rather than theoretical physicochemical equations.

SELDM is a lumped parameter model because the highway site, the upstream basin, and the lake basin each are represented as a single homogeneous unit. Each of these source areas is represented by average basin properties, and results from SELDM are calculated as point estimates for the site of interest. Use of the lumped parameter approach facilitates rapid specification of model parameters to develop planning-level estimates with available data. The approach allows for parsimony in the required inputs to and outputs from the model and flexibility in the use of the model. For example, SELDM can be used to model runoff from various land covers or land uses by using the highway-site definition as long as representative water quality and impervious-fraction data are available.

SELDM is easy to use because it has a simple graphical user interface and because much of the information and data needed to run SELDM are embedded in the model. SELDM provides input statistics for precipitation, prestorm flow, runoff coefficients, and concentrations of selected water-quality constituents from National datasets. Input statistics may be selected on the basis of the latitude, longitude, and physical characteristics of the site of interest and the upstream basin. The user also may derive and input statistics for each variable that are specific to a given site of interest or a given area. Information and data from hundreds to thousands of sites across the country were compiled to facilitate use of SELDM. Most of the necessary input data are obtained by defining the location of the site of interest and five simple basin properties. These basin properties are the drainage area, the basin length, the basin slope, the impervious fraction, and the basin development factor

SELDM models the potential effect of mitigation measures by using Monte Carlo methods with statistics that approximate the net effects of structural and nonstructural best management practices (BMPs). Structural BMPs are defined as the components of the drainage pathway between the source of runoff and a stormwater discharge location that affect the volume, timing, or quality of runoff. SELDM uses a simple stochastic statistical model of BMP performance to develop planning-level estimates of runoff-event characteristics. This statistical approach can be used to represent a single BMP or an assemblage of BMPs. The SELDM BMP-treatment module has provisions for stochastic modeling of three stormwater treatments: volume reduction, hydrograph extension, and water-quality treatment. In SELDM, these three treatment variables are modeled by using the trapezoidal distribution and the rank correlation with the associated highway-runoff variables. This report describes methods for calculating the trapezoidal-distribution statistics and rank correlation coefficients for stochastic modeling of volume reduction, hydrograph extension, and water-quality treatment by structural stormwater BMPs and provides the calculated values for these variables. These statistics are different from the statistics commonly used to characterize or compare BMPs. They are designed to provide a stochastic transfer function to approximate the quantity, duration, and quality of BMP effluent given the associated inflow values for a population of storm events.

== Model interface ==
SELDM was developed as a Microsoft Access® database software application to facilitate storage, handling, and use of the hydrologic dataset with a simple graphical user interface (GUI). The program's menu-driven GUI uses standard Microsoft Visual Basic for Applications® (VBA) interface controls to facilitate entry, processing, and output of data. Appendix 4 of the SELDM manual has detailed instructions for using the GUI.

The SELDM user interface has one or more GUI forms that are used to enter four categories of input data, which include documentation, site and region information, hydrologic statistics, and water-quality data. The documentation data include information about the analyst, the project, and the analysis. The site and region data include the highway-site characteristics, the ecoregions, the upstream-basin characteristics, and, if a lake analysis is selected, the lake-basin characteristics. The hydrologic data include precipitation, streamflow, and runoff-coefficient statistics. The water-quality data include highway-runoff-quality statistics, upstream-water-quality statistics, downstream-water-quality definitions, and BMP-performance statistics. There also is a GUI form for running the model and accessing the distinct set of output files. The SELDM interface is designed to populate the database with data and statistics for the analysis and to specify index variables that are used by the program to query the database when SELDM is run. It is necessary to step through the input forms each time an analysis is run.

== Model output ==
The results of each SELDM analysis are written to 5–10 output files, depending on the options that were selected during the analysis-specification process. The five output files that are created for every model run are the output documentation, highway-runoff quality, annual highway runoff, precipitation events, and stormflow file. If the Stream Basin or Stream and Lake Basin output options are selected, then the prestorm streamflow and dilution factor files also are created. If these same two output options are selected and, in addition, one or more downstream water-quality pairs are defined by using the water-quality menu, then the upstream water-quality and downstream water-quality output files also are created by SELDM. If the Stream and Lake Basin Output or Lake Basin Output option is selected, and one or more downstream water-quality pairs are defined by using the water-quality menu, then the Lake Analysis output file is created when the Lake Basin Analysis is run. The output files are written as tab-delimited ASCII text files in a relational database (RDB) format that can be imported into many software packages. This output is designed to facilitate post-modeling analysis and presentation of results.

The benefit of the Monte Carlo analysis is not to decrease uncertainty in the input statistics, but to represent the different combinations of the variables that determine potential risks of water-quality excursions. SELDM provides a method for rapid assessment of information that is otherwise difficult or impossible to obtain because it models the interactions among hydrologic variables (with different probability distributions) that result in a population of values that represent likely long-term outcomes from runoff processes and the potential effects of different mitigation measures. SELDM also provides the means for rapidly doing sensitivity analyses to determine the potential effects of different input assumptions on the risks for water-quality excursions. SELDM produces a population of storm-event and annual values to address the questions about the potential frequency, magnitude, and duration of water-quality excursions. The output represents a collection of random events rather than a time series. Each storm that is generated in SELDM is identified by sequence number and annual-load accounting year. The model generates each storm randomly; there is no serial correlation, and the order of storms does not reflect seasonal patterns. The annual-load accounting years, which are just random collections of events generated with the sum of storm interevent times less than or equal to a year, are used to generate annual highway flows and loads for TMDL analysis and the lake basin analysis.

In 2019, the USGS developed a model post processor for SELDM to facilitate analysis and graphing of results from SELDM simulations; that software, known as InterpretSELDM, is available in the public domain on a USGS ScienceBase site.

== History ==
SELDM was developed between 2010 and 2013 and was published as version 1.0.0 in March 2013. A small problem with the algorithm used to calculate upstream and lake-basin transport curves was discovered and version 1.0.1 was released in July 2013. Version 1.0.2 was released in June, 2016 to use the Cunnane plotting position formula for all output files. Version 1.0.3 was released in July, 2018 to address issues with load calculations for constituents with concentrations of nanograms per liter or picograms per liter and to address other sundry issues. Version 1.1.0 was released in May 2021 to add batch processing, change the highway runoff duration used for upstream transport curves from the discharge duration, which could vary from BMP to BMP, to the runoff-concurrent duration and volume, and fix a problem that allowed users to simulate a dependent variable in a lake analysis without the explanatory variable, which caused an error. Version 1.1.1 was released in December 2022 to make SELDM compatible with the 32- and 64-bit versions of Microsoft Office; this version has the ability to simulate emerging contaminants including Microplastics, PFAS/PFOS (see Per- and polyfluoroalkyl substances and Perfluorooctanesulfonic acid), and tire chemicals (see Tire manufacturing, Rubber pollution, and 6PPD). The code for SELDM is open source and public domain code that can be downloaded from the SELDM software support page.

== See also ==
- Computer simulation – Process of mathematical modelling, performed on a computer
- Drainage basin – Land area where water converges to a common outlet
- Monte Carlo method – Probabilistic problem-solving algorithm
- Hydrology – Science of the movement, distribution, and quality of water on Earth
- Stochastic – Randomly determined process
- Stormwater – Water that originates during precipitation events and snow/ice melt
- Surface runoff – Flow of excess rainwater not infiltrating in the ground over its surface
- Surface-water hydrology – Sub-field of hydrology concerned with above-earth water
- Water pollution – Contamination of water bodies
- Water quality – Assessment against standards for use
- Water quality modelling – Prediction of water pollution using mathematical simulation techniques
