= Surface runoff =

Flow of excess rainwater not infiltrating in the ground over its surface

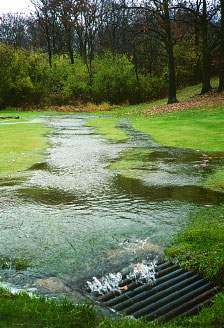
Runoff flowing into a stormwater drain

Surface runoff (also known as overland flow or terrestrial runoff) is the unconfined flow of water over the ground surface, in contrast to channel runoff (or stream flow). It occurs when excess rainwater, stormwater, meltwater, or other sources, can no longer sufficiently rapidly infiltrate into the soil. This can occur when the soil is saturated by water to its full capacity, and the rain arrives more quickly than the soil can absorb it. Surface runoff often occurs because impervious areas (such as roofs and pavement) do not allow water to soak into the ground. Furthermore, runoff can occur either through natural or human-made processes.

Surface runoff is a major component of the water cycle. It is the primary agent of soil erosion by water. The land area producing runoff that drains to a common point is called a drainage basin.

Runoff that occurs on the ground surface before reaching a channel can be a nonpoint source of pollution, as it can carry human-made contaminants or natural forms of pollution (such as rotting leaves). Human-made contaminants in runoff include petroleum, pesticides, fertilizers and others. Much agricultural pollution is exacerbated by surface runoff, leading to a number of downstream impacts, including nutrient pollution that causes eutrophication.

In addition to causing water erosion and pollution, surface runoff in urban areas is a primary cause of urban flooding, which can result in property damage, damp and mold in basements, and street flooding.

== Generation ==
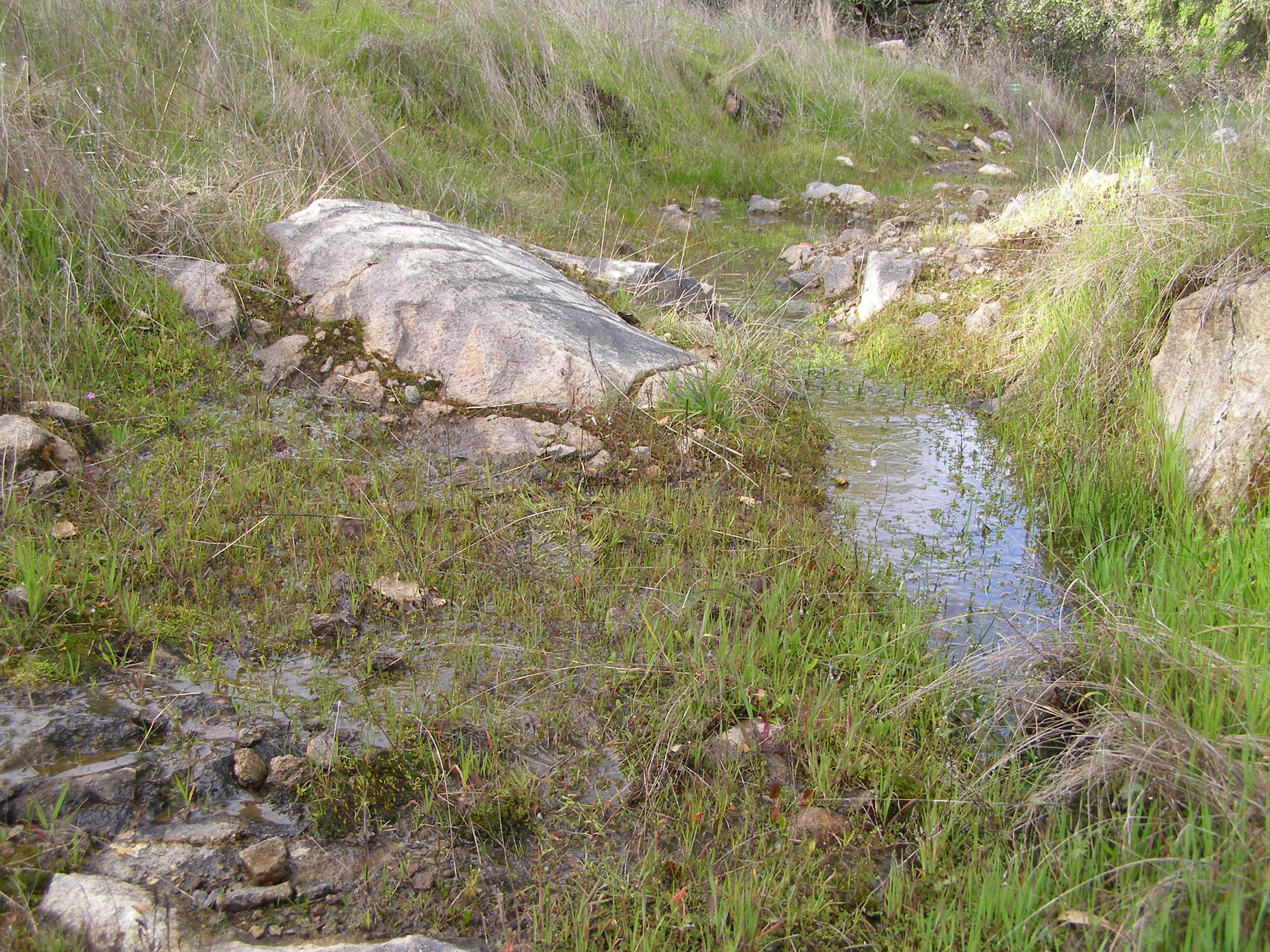
Surface runoff from a hillside after soil is saturated

Surface runoff is defined as precipitation (rain, snow, sleet, or hail) that reaches a surface stream without ever passing below the soil surface. It is distinct from direct runoff, which is runoff that reaches surface streams immediately after rainfall or melting snowfall and excludes runoff generated by the melting of snowpack or glaciers.

Snow and glacier melt occur only in areas cold enough for these to form permanently. Typically snowmelt will peak in the spring and glacier melt in the summer, leading to pronounced flow maxima in rivers affected by them. The determining factor of the rate of melting of snow or glaciers is both air temperature and the duration of sunlight. In high mountain regions, streams frequently rise on sunny days and fall on cloudy ones for this reason.

In areas where there is no snow, runoff will come from rainfall. However, not all rainfall will produce runoff because storage from soils can absorb light showers. On the extremely ancient soils of Australia and Southern Africa, proteoid roots with their extremely dense networks of root hairs can absorb so much rainwater as to prevent runoff even with substantial amounts of rainfall. In these regions, even on less infertile cracking clay soils, high amounts of rainfall and potential evaporation are needed to generate any surface runoff, leading to specialised adaptations to extremely variable (usually ephemeral) streams.

=== Infiltration excess overland flow ===
Stormwater management using trees (animation)

This occurs when the rate of rainfall on a surface exceeds the rate at which water can infiltrate the ground, and any depression storage has already been filled. This is also called Hortonian overland flow (after Robert E. Horton), or unsaturated overland flow. This more commonly occurs in arid and semi-arid regions, where rainfall intensities are high and the soil infiltration capacity is reduced because of surface sealing, or in urban areas where pavements prevent water from infiltrating.

=== Saturation excess overland flow ===
When the soil is saturated and the depression storage filled, and rain continues to fall, the rainfall will immediately produce surface runoff. The level of antecedent soil moisture is one factor affecting the time until soil becomes saturated. This runoff is called saturation excess overland flow, saturated overland flow, or Dunne runoff.

=== Antecedent soil moisture ===
Soil retains a degree of moisture after a rainfall. This residual water moisture affects the soil's infiltration capacity. During the next rainfall event, the infiltration capacity will cause the soil to be saturated at a different rate. The higher the level of antecedent soil moisture, the more quickly the soil becomes saturated. Once the soil is saturated, runoff occurs. Therefore, surface runoff is a significant factor in the controlling of soil moisture after medium and low intensity storms.

=== Subsurface return flow ===
After water infiltrates the soil on an up-slope portion of a hill, the water may flow laterally through the soil, and exfiltrate (flow out of the soil) closer to a channel. This is called subsurface return flow or throughflow.

As it flows, the amount of runoff may be reduced in a number of possible ways: a small portion of it may evapotranspire; water may become temporarily stored in microtopographic depressions; and a portion of it may infiltrate as it flows overland. Any remaining surface water eventually flows into a receiving water body such as a river, lake, estuary or ocean.

== Human influence ==
Precipitation washing contaminates into local streams

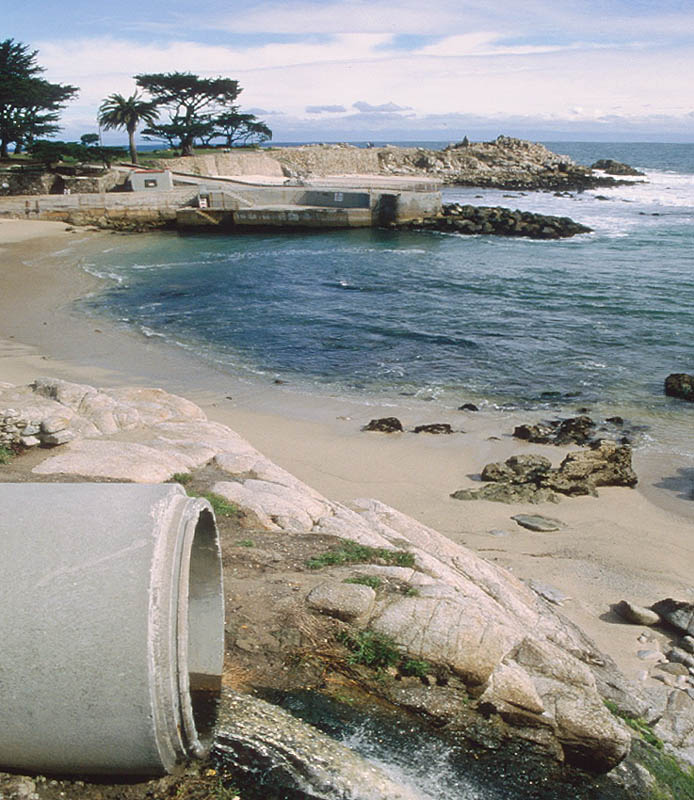
Urban surface water runoff

Urbanization increases surface runoff by creating more impervious surfaces such as pavement and buildings that do not allow percolation of the water down through the soil to the aquifer. It is instead forced directly into streams or storm water runoff drains, where erosion and siltation can be major problems, even when flooding is not. Increased runoff reduces groundwater recharge, thus lowering the water table and making droughts worse, especially for agricultural farmers and others who depend on the water wells.

When anthropogenic contaminants are dissolved or suspended in runoff, the human impact is expanded to create water pollution. This pollutant load can reach various receiving waters such as streams, rivers, lakes, estuaries and oceans with resultant water chemistry changes to these water systems and their related ecosystems.

As humans continue to alter the climate through the addition of greenhouse gases to the atmosphere, precipitation patterns are expected to change as the atmospheric capacity for water vapor increases. This will have direct consequences on runoff amounts.

=== Urban runoff ===
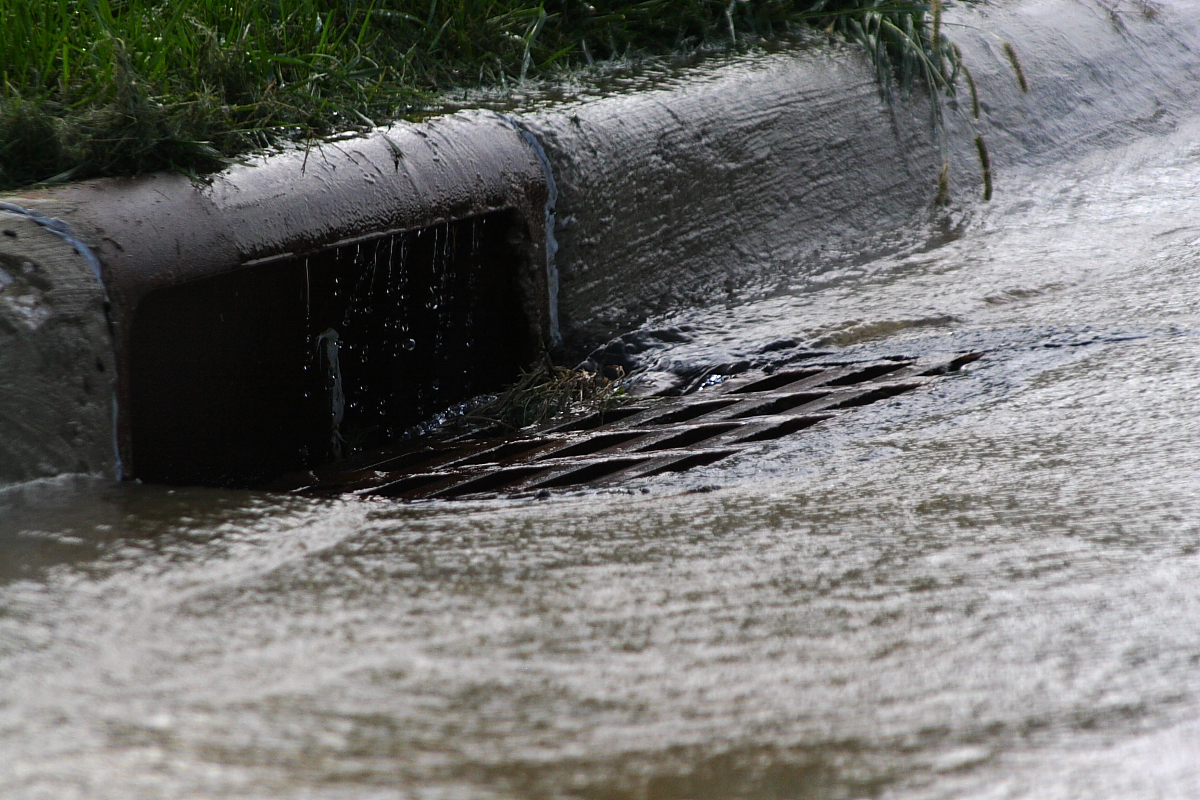
Urban runoff flowing into a storm drain

Urban runoff is surface runoff of rainwater, landscape irrigation, and car washing created by urbanization. Impervious surfaces (roads, parking lots and sidewalks) are constructed during land development. During rain, storms, and other precipitation events, these surfaces (built from materials such as asphalt and concrete), along with rooftops, carry polluted stormwater to storm drains, instead of allowing the water to percolate through soil.

This causes lowering of the water table (because groundwater recharge is lessened) and flooding since the amount of water that remains on the surface is greater. Most municipal storm sewer systems discharge untreated stormwater to streams, rivers, and bays. This excess water can also make its way into people's properties through basement backups and seepage through building walls and floors. Urban runoff can be a major source of urban flooding and water pollution in urban communities worldwide.

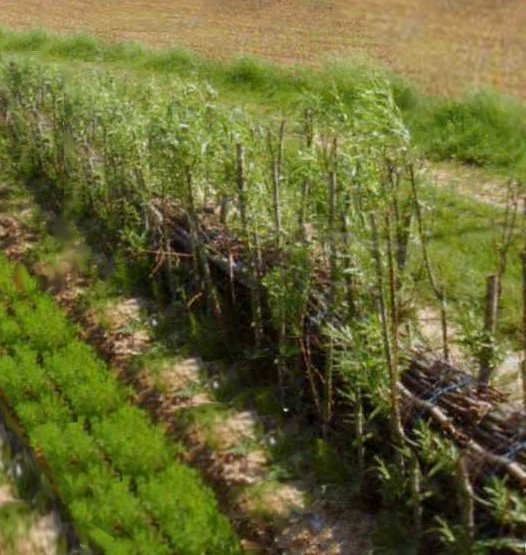
Willow hedge strengthened with fascines for the limitation of runoff, north of France

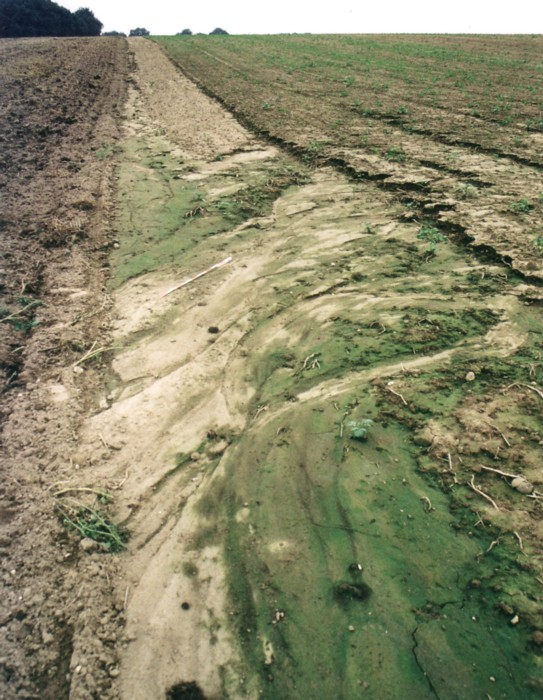
Soil erosion by water on intensively-tilled farmland

=== Industrial runoff ===
Industrial stormwater is runoff from precipitation (rain, snow, sleet, freezing rain, or hail) that lands on industrial sites (e.g. manufacturing facilities, mines, airports). This runoff is often polluted by materials that are handled or stored on the sites, and the facilities are subject to regulations to control the discharges.

To manage industrial stormwater effectively, facilities use best management practices (BMPs) that aim to both prevent pollutants from entering the runoff and treat water before it's released from the site. Common preventive steps include maintaining clean workspaces, conducting routine equipment checks, storing materials properly, preventing spills, and training staff on pollution prevention techniques.

To treat stormwater, facilities may install structural controls such as detention and retention ponds, constructed wetlands, filter systems, or oil-water separators. These systems help reduce pollution by settling out solids, filtering water, or supporting natural treatment processes before the water is discharged.

== Effects of surface runoff ==
=== Erosion and deposition ===
Surface runoff can cause erosion of the Earth's surface; eroded material may be deposited a considerable distance away. There are four main types of soil erosion by water: splash erosion, sheet erosion, rill erosion and gully erosion. Splash erosion is the result of mechanical collision of raindrops with the soil surface: soil particles which are dislodged by the impact then move with the surface runoff. Sheet erosion is the overland transport of sediment by runoff without a well defined channel. Soil surface roughness may cause runoff to become concentrated into narrower flow paths: as these incise, the small but well-defined channels which are formed are known as rills. These channels can be as small as one centimeter wide or as large as several meters. If runoff continues to incise and enlarge rills, they may eventually grow to become gullies. Gully erosion can transport large amounts of eroded material in a small time period.

Reduced crop productivity usually results from erosion, and these effects are studied in the field of soil conservation. The soil particles carried in runoff vary in size from about 0.001 millimeter to 1.0 millimeter in diameter. Larger particles settle over short transport distances, whereas small particles can be carried over long distances suspended in the water column. Erosion of silty soils that contain smaller particles generates turbidity and diminishes light transmission, which disrupts aquatic ecosystems.

Entire sections of countries have been rendered unproductive by erosion. On the high central plateau of Madagascar, approximately ten percent of that country's land area, virtually the entire landscape is devoid of vegetation, with erosive gully furrows typically in excess of 50 meters deep and one kilometer wide. Shifting cultivation is a farming system which sometimes incorporates the slash and burn method in some regions of the world. Erosion causes loss of the fertile topsoil and reduces its fertility and quality of the agricultural produce.

Modern industrial farming is another major cause of erosion. Over a third of the U.S. Corn Belt has completely lost its topsoil. Switching to no-till practices would reduce soil erosion from U.S. agricultural fields by more than 70 percent.

=== Environmental effects ===
The principal environmental issues associated with runoff are the impacts to surface water, groundwater and soil through transport of water pollutants to these systems. Ultimately these consequences translate into human health risk, ecosystem disturbance and aesthetic impact to water resources. Some of the contaminants that create the greatest impact to surface waters arising from runoff are petroleum substances, herbicides and fertilizers. Quantitative uptake by surface runoff of pesticides and other contaminants has been studied since the 1960s, and early on contact of pesticides with water was known to enhance phytotoxicity.

In the case of surface waters, the impacts translate to water pollution, since the streams and rivers have received runoff carrying various chemicals or sediments. When surface waters are used as potable water supplies, they can be compromised regarding health risks and clean drinking water aesthetics (that is, odor, color and turbidity effects). Contaminated surface waters risk altering the metabolic processes of the aquatic species that they host; these alterations can lead to death, such as fish kills, or alter the balance of populations present. Other specific impacts are on animal mating, spawning, egg and larvae viability, juvenile survival and plant productivity. Some research shows surface runoff of pesticides, such as DDT, can alter the gender of fish species genetically, which transforms male into female fish.

Surface runoff occurring within forests can supply lakes with high loads of mineral nitrogen and phosphorus leading to eutrophication. Runoff waters within coniferous forests are also enriched with humic acids and can lead to humification of water bodies Additionally, high standing and young islands in the tropics and subtropics can undergo high soil erosion rates and also contribute large material fluxes to the coastal ocean. Such land derived runoff of sediment nutrients, carbon, and contaminants can have large impacts on global biogeochemical cycles and marine and coastal ecosystems.

In the case of groundwater, the main issue is contamination of drinking water, if the aquifer is abstracted for human use. Regarding soil contamination, runoff waters can have two important pathways of concern. Firstly, runoff water can extract soil contaminants and carry them in the form of water pollution to even more sensitive aquatic habitats. Secondly, runoff can deposit contaminants on pristine soils, creating health or ecological consequences.

==== Agricultural issues ====
The other context of agricultural issues involves the transport of agricultural chemicals (nitrates, phosphates, pesticides, herbicides, etc.) via surface runoff. This result occurs when chemical use is excessive or poorly timed with respect to high precipitation. The resulting contaminated runoff represents not only a waste of agricultural chemicals, but also an environmental threat to downstream ecosystems. Pine straws are often used to protect soil from soil erosion and weed growth. However, harvesting these crops may result in the increase of soil erosion.

=== Economic Issues ===
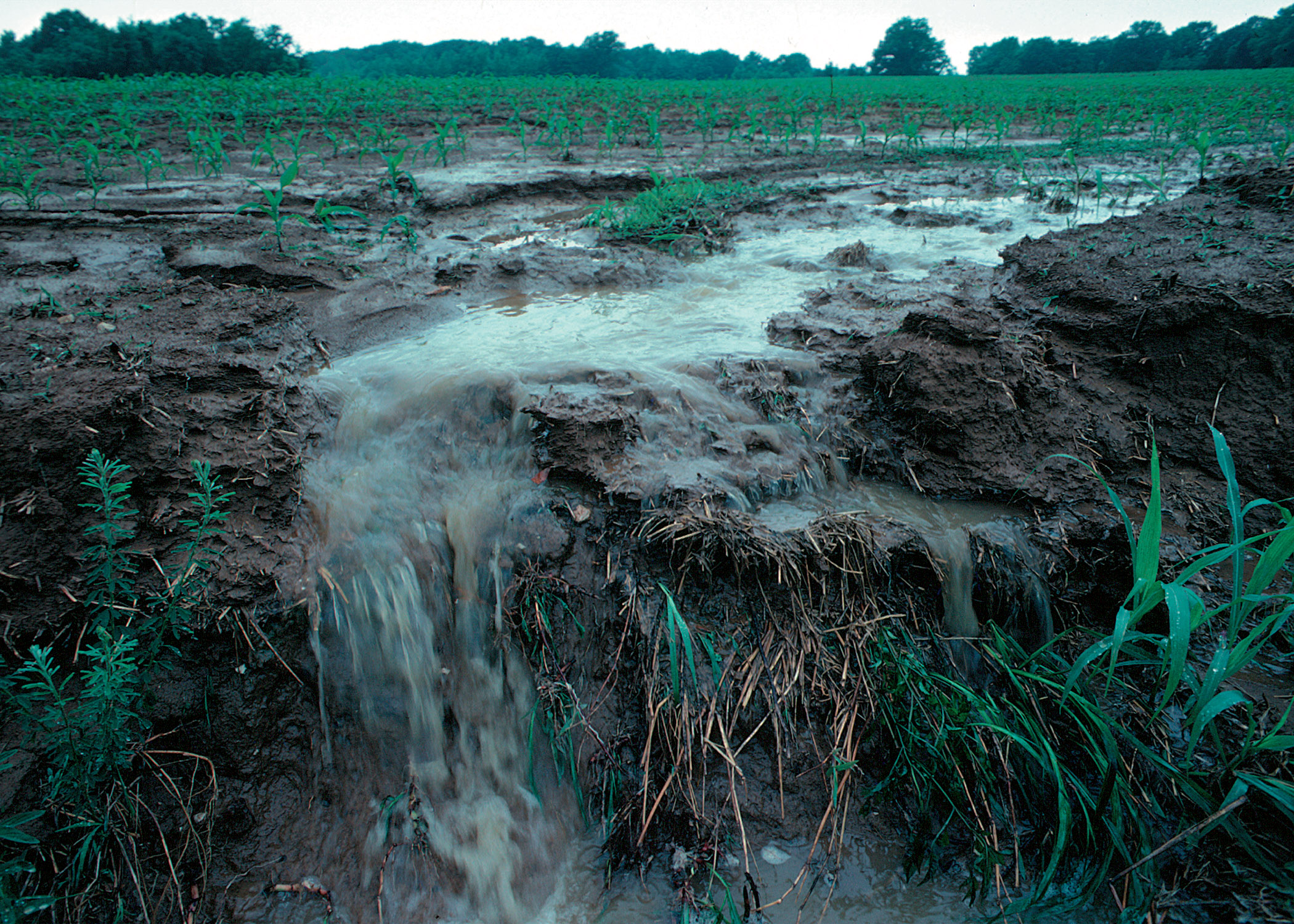
Farmland runoff

Surface runoff results in a significant amount of economic effects. Pine straws are cost effective ways of dealing with surface runoff. Moreover, surface runoff can be reused through the growth of elephant grass. In Nigeria, elephant grass is considered to be an economical way in which surface runoff and erosion can be reduced. Also, China has suffered significant impact from surface runoff to most of their economical crops such as vegetables. Therefore, they are known to have implemented a system which reduced loss of nutrients (nitrogen and phosphorus) in soil.

=== Flooding ===
Flooding occurs when a watercourse is unable to convey the quantity of runoff flowing downstream. The frequency with which this occurs is described by a return period. Flooding is a natural process, which maintains ecosystem composition and processes, but it can also be altered by land use changes such as river engineering. Floods can be both beneficial to societies or cause damage. Agriculture along the Nile floodplain took advantage of the seasonal flooding that deposited nutrients beneficial for crops. However, as the number and susceptibility of settlements increase, flooding increasingly becomes a natural hazard. In urban areas, surface runoff is the primary cause of urban flooding, known for its repetitive and costly impact on communities. Adverse impacts span loss of life, property damage, contamination of water supplies, loss of crops, and social dislocation and temporary homelessness. Floods are among the most devastating of natural disasters. The use of supplemental irrigation is also recognized as a significant way in which crops such as maize can retain nitrogen fertilizers in soil, resulting in improvement of crop water availability.

== Mitigation and treatment ==
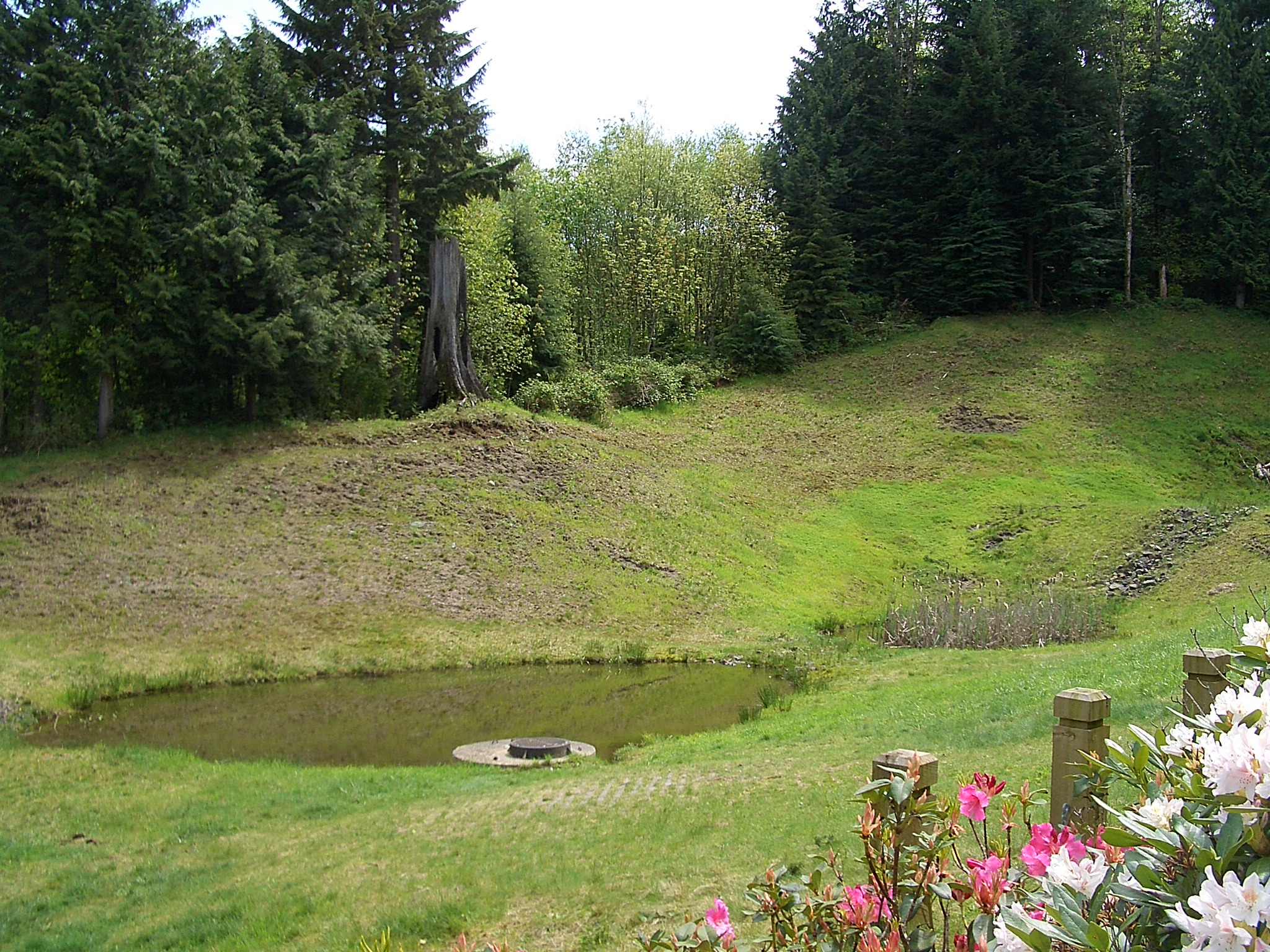
Runoff holding ponds (Uplands neighborhood of North Bend, Washington)

Mitigation of adverse impacts of runoff can take several forms:

- Land use development controls aimed at minimizing impervious surfaces in urban areas
- Erosion controls for farms and construction sites
- Flood control and retrofit programs, such as green infrastructure
- Chemical use and handling controls in agriculture, landscape maintenance, industrial use, etc.

Land use controls. Many world regulatory agencies have encouraged research on methods of minimizing total surface runoff by avoiding unnecessary hardscape. Many municipalities have produced guidelines and codes (zoning and related ordinances) for land developers that encourage minimum width sidewalks, use of pavers set in earth for driveways and walkways and other design techniques to allow maximum water infiltration in urban settings. An example of a local program specifying design requirements, construction practices and maintenance requirements for buildings and properties is in Santa Monica, California.

Erosion controls have appeared since medieval times when farmers realized the importance of contour farming to protect soil resources. Beginning in the 1950s these agricultural methods became increasingly more sophisticated. In the 1960s some state and local governments began to focus their efforts on mitigation of construction runoff by requiring builders to implement erosion and sediment controls (ESCs). This included such techniques as: use of straw bales and barriers to slow runoff on slopes, installation of silt fences, programming construction for months that have less rainfall and minimizing extent and duration of exposed graded areas. Montgomery County, Maryland implemented the first local government sediment control program in 1965, and this was followed by a statewide program in Maryland in 1970.

Flood control programs as early as the first half of the twentieth century became quantitative in predicting peak flows of riverine systems. Progressively strategies have been developed to minimize peak flows and also to reduce channel velocities. Some of the techniques commonly applied are: provision of holding ponds (also called detention basins or balancing lakes) to buffer riverine peak flows, use of energy dissipators in channels to reduce stream velocity and land use controls to minimize runoff.

Chemical use and handling. Following enactment of the U.S. Resource Conservation and Recovery Act (RCRA) in 1976, and later the Water Quality Act of 1987, states and cities have become more vigilant in controlling the containment and storage of toxic chemicals, thus preventing releases and leakage. Methods commonly applied are: requirements for double containment of underground storage tanks, registration of hazardous materials usage, reduction in numbers of allowed pesticides and more stringent regulation of fertilizers and herbicides in landscape maintenance. In many industrial cases, pretreatment of wastes is required, to minimize escape of pollutants into sanitary or stormwater sewers.

The U.S. Clean Water Act (CWA) requires that local governments in urbanized areas (as defined by the Census Bureau) obtain stormwater discharge permits for their drainage systems. Essentially this means that the locality must operate a stormwater management program for all surface runoff that enters the municipal separate storm sewer system ("MS4"). EPA and state regulations and related publications outline six basic components that each local program must contain:

- Public education (informing individuals, households, businesses about ways to avoid stormwater pollution)
- Public involvement (support public participation in implementation of local programs)
- Illicit discharge detection & elimination (removing sanitary sewer or other non-stormwater connections to the MS4)
- Construction site runoff controls (i.e. erosion and sediment controls)
- Post-construction (i.e. permanent) stormwater management controls
- Pollution prevention (e.g. improved chemical handling, including management of motor fuels and oil, fertilizers, pesticides and roadway deicers) and "good housekeeping" measures (e.g. system maintenance).

Other property owners which operate storm drain systems similar to municipalities, such as state highway systems, universities, military bases and prisons, are also subject to the MS4 permit requirements.

== Measurement and mathematical modeling ==
Runoff is analyzed by using mathematical models in combination with various water quality sampling methods. Measurements can be made using continuous automated water quality analysis instruments targeted on pollutants such as specific organic or inorganic chemicals, pH, turbidity, etc., or targeted on secondary indicators such as dissolved oxygen. Measurements can also be made in batch form by extracting a single water sample and conducting chemical or physical tests on that sample.

In the 1950s or earlier, hydrology transport models appeared to calculate quantities of runoff, primarily for flood forecasting. Beginning in the early 1970s, computer models were developed to analyze the transport of runoff carrying water pollutants. These models considered dissolution rates of various chemicals, infiltration into soils, and the ultimate pollutant load delivered to receiving waters. One of the earliest models addressing chemical dissolution in runoff and resulting transport was developed in the early 1970s under contract to the United States Environmental Protection Agency (EPA). This computer model formed the basis of much of the mitigation study that led to strategies for land use and chemical handling controls.

Increasingly, stormwater practitioners have recognized the need for Monte Carlo models to simulate stormwater processes because of natural variations in multiple variables affecting runoff quality and quantity. The benefit of the Monte Carlo analysis is not to decrease uncertainty in the input statistics but to represent the different combinations of the variables that determine potential risks of water-quality excursions. One example of this type of stormwater model is the stochastic empirical loading and dilution model (SELDM) is a stormwater quality model. SELDM is designed to transform complex scientific data into meaningful information about the risk of adverse effects of runoff on receiving waters, the potential need for mitigation measures, and the effectiveness of such management measures for reducing these risks. SELDM provides a method for rapid assessment of information that is otherwise difficult or impossible to obtain because it models the interactions among hydrologic variables (with different probability distributions), resulting in a population of values representing likely long-term outcomes from runoff processes and the potential effects of various mitigation measures. SELDM also provides the means for rapidly doing sensitivity analyses to determine the possible effects of varying input assumptions on the risks for water-quality excursions.

Other computer models have been developed (such as the DSSAM Model) that allow surface runoff to be tracked through a river course as reactive water pollutants. In this case, the surface runoff may be considered to be a line source of water pollution to the receiving waters.

== See also ==
- Agricultural wastewater – Contamination of water bodies
- Agricultural nutrient runoff – Farm management process
- Bioswale – Landscape elements designed to manage surface runoff water
- Catchwater – Runoff catching or channeling device
- Effluent – Liquid waste or sewage discharged into a river or the sea
- Flash flood
- HydroCAD a software tool for H&H modeling
- Hydrological model – Predicting and managing water resources
- Nationwide Urban Runoff Program – US pollution research program – U.S. Research program
- Nonpoint source pollution – Pollution resulting from multiple sources
- Organic matter – Matter composed of organic compounds
- Rain garden – Runoff reducing landscaping method
- Runoff curve number – Parameter used in hydrology
- Runoff model (reservoir) – Type of water motion
- Safe water
- Stochastic empirical loading and dilution model – Stormwater quality model
- Trophic state index – Measure of the ability of water to sustain biological productivity
