= Hydrologic Research Center (US) =

- Abbreviation: HRC
- Formation: 1993; 33 years ago
- Type: Public benefit
- Legal status: Non profit
- Purpose: Development of effective and sustainable solutions to global water issues
- Website: www.hrcwater.org

Hydrologic Research Center (HRC), founded in 1993, is a public-benefit non-profit research, technology transfer, and science cooperation and education organization, dedicated to the development of effective and sustainable solutions to global water issues. HRC's purpose is to provide a conduit for academic and other up-to-date research to be made suitable for effective application to field operational problems that involve water management and flood disaster mitigation. The vision of HRC is to assist in limiting societal vulnerability and preserving resiliency in basic human needs, livelihoods, agriculture, water resources, healthy ecosystems, and natural resources. Around the world flash flooding and flooding are the most common natural disasters and the leading cause of natural disaster fatalities worldwide – 40% of all natural disasters.

HRC partners with local governments in over 70 countries and other trusted nongovernmental organizations to promote sustainable programs that include education in flash floods, management of water resources, and the development of flash flood guidance systems to provide vital early warning of flash floods.

== Research Journal ==
- Journal of Hydrology ISSN 0022-1694, Elsevier
- Hydrology Research ISSN Print: 0029–1277, IWA Publishing
- Journal of the American Water Resources Association Online ISSN 1752-1688, John Wiley & Sons, Inc

== See also ==
- Hydrology
- Meteorology
- Flash flood watch
- Flash flood warning
