= Flood warning =

Weather warning indicating areal flooding has been observed or is imminent

A flood warning or flood alert is the task of making use of flood forecasts to make decisions about whether warnings should be issued to the general public or if previous warnings should be rescinded or retracted. The task of providing warning for floods is divided into two parts:

- decisions to escalate or change the state of alertness internal to the flood warning service provider, where this may sometimes include partner organisations involved in emergency response;
- decisions to issue flood warnings to the general public.

The decisions made by someone responsible for initiating flood warnings must be influenced by a number of factors, which include:

- The reliability of the available forecasts and how this changes with lead-time.
- The amount of time that the public would need to respond effectively to a warning.
- The delay between a warning being initiated and it being received by the public.
- The need to avoid issuing warnings unnecessarily, because of the wasted efforts of those who respond and because a record of false alarms means that fewer would respond to future warnings.
- The need to avoid situations where a warning condition is rescinded only for the warning to be re-issued within a short time, again because of the wasted efforts of the general public and because such occurrences would bring the flood warning service into disrepute.

A computer system for flood warning will usually contain sub-systems for:

- flood forecasting;
- automatic alerting of internal staff;
- tracking of alert messages and acknowledgements received;
- diversion of messages to alternates where no acknowledgement received.

== By country ==
The type of flood warning service available varies greatly from country to country, and a location may receive warnings from more than one service.

=== Philippines ===
In the Philippines, the Philippine Atmospheric, Geophysical and Astronomical Services Administration (PAGASA) branch of the Department of Science and Technology (DOST) issues general flood advisory (for non-telemetered river basins whenever there is a significant amount of rainfall recorded).

Flood Warnings issued by the PAGASA
Warning name	Description	Forecast	Action/Response
Flood Monitoring	Telemetered: Slow rise in water level but still below alarm level Non-Telemetered: Monitor for possible flooding area	Telemeterd: Flood is possible Non-Telemeterd: Light to Moderate Rainfall	Non-Telemetrd: Advised to take Precautionary Measures
Flood Alert	Telemetered: Water level is continuously rising but still below critical level Non-Telemetered: Alert for possible flash floods and landslides	Telemeterd: Flood is threatening Non-Telemeterd: Moderate to Heavy Rainfall	Non-Telemeterd: Advised to be alert for possible flood, flash flood and landslides
Flood Warning	Telemetered: Water level is above critical level Non-Telemetered: Flood is occurring immediate action is recommended	Telemeterd: Flood is occurring Non-Telemeterd: Heavy to Intense Rainfall	Non-Telemeterd: Advised to take appropriate action
Severe Flood Warning	Telemetered: Water level is continuously rising above critical level Non-Telemetered: Flood is persisting force evacuation is recommended	Telemeterd: Flood is persisting Non-Telemeterd: Intense to Torrential Rainfall	Non-Telemeterd: Advised to force evacuation
Final	Telemetered: Slow recession of water level Non-Telemetered: Light rains	Flood is no longer possible	

=== United Kingdom ===
Arrangements for flood warnings vary across the United Kingdom with several agencies leading on warnings for emergency responders and the public. The Environment Agency, Natural Resources Wales and Scottish Environment Protection Agency all undertake location specific flood warning activities for communities at risk depending upon the scale of flood risk, technical challenges and investment needed to deliver a reliable service.

Prior to issuing a flood warning consideration is given to:

- the needs of communities to activate emergency response plans
- the nature of the catchment or coastline and the lead time that may be provided
- meteorological observations and forecast information on rainfall and coastal water levels
- hydrological observations and flood forecasts
- reference to thresholds of historic or forecast flood levels

Dissemination of flood warnings has moved towards a service whereby those at risk can pre-register to receive warnings by phone, email or text message from an automatic system, Floodline. Both warnings and updates about current conditions are also carried by local radio stations. In addition, live updates are carried by the Environment Agency's website, showing which locations have flood warnings in place and the severity of these warnings.

There is currently no flood warning system in Northern Ireland, but the Met Office does issue weather warnings. Flood risk management is the responsibility of Rivers Agency in Northern Ireland. Consideration will be given to the introduction of a warning system as part of the implementation of the EU Floods directive.

=== United States ===
In the United States, a flash flood watch is issued by the National Weather Service (NWS) when weather conditions are favorable for very heavy rain that could cause flooding or flash flooding. A watch does not mean that flooding is occurring, only that weather conditions have created or will create a significant risk for it. If flooding occurs, a flood warning or flash flood warning would be issued, and immediate action should be taken. A flood warning or flash flood warning is issued when flooding is imminent or already occurring. When flood warnings are issued, it means that area waterways will likely soon be in flood. Not all flood watches suggest that large-scale flooding, such as during landfalling tropical cyclones, is possible.

In the United States, the National Weather Service issues flood watches and warnings for large-scale, gradual river flooding. Watches are issued when flooding is possible or expected within 12–48 hours, and warnings are issued when flooding over a large area or river flooding is imminent or occurring. Both can be issued on a county-by-county basis or for specific rivers or points along a river. When rapid flooding from heavy rain or a dam failure is expected, flash flood watches and warnings are issued.

In the U.S. and Canada, dissemination of flood warnings is covered by Specific Area Message Encoding (SAME) code FLW, which is used by the U.S. Emergency Alert System and NOAA Weather Radio network and in Canada's Weatheradio Canada network.

"Flood statements" are issued by the National Weather Service to inform the public of flooding along major streams in which there is not a serious threat to life or property. They may also follow a flood warning to give later information.

==== Example of a flood warning ====
Flood Warning issued in Southern Maryland
An example of a flood warning being issued in Charles County on 18 December 2023 at 7:22 PM EST.

The following is an example of a "Flood Warning." The Sabine River is used as an example:

 394
WGUS44 KSHV 070219 RRA
FLWSHV

BULLETIN - IMMEDIATE BROADCAST REQUESTED
Flood Warning
National Weather Service Shreveport LA
819 PM CST Wed Jan 6 2021

...The National Weather Service in Shreveport LA has issued a Flood
Warning for the following rivers in Texas...

  Sabine River Near Hawkins affecting Wood, Smith and Upshur
  Counties.

PRECAUTIONARY/PREPAREDNESS ACTIONS...

Do not drive cars through flooded areas.
Caution is urged when walking near riverbanks.
A Flood Warning means that flooding is imminent or occurring. All
interested parties should take necessary precautions immediately.

Turn around, don't drown when encountering flooded roads. Most flood
deaths occur in vehicles.

For more hydrologic information, copy and paste the following website
address into your favorite web browser URL bar:
water.weather.gov/ahps2/index.php?wfo=shv

TXC423-459-499-080230-
/O.NEW.KSHV.FL.W.0009.210109T0430Z-210111T0224Z/
/HAKT2.1.ER.210109T0430Z.210110T0000Z.210110T2024Z.NO/
819 PM CST Wed Jan 6 2021

The National Weather Service in Shreveport has issued a

* Flood Warning for
  the Sabine River Near Hawkins.
* From Friday evening to Sunday evening.
* At 7:45 PM CST Wednesday the stage was 19.1 feet.
* Flood stage is 23.0 feet.
* Minor flooding is forecast.
* Forecast...The river is expected to rise above flood stage late
  Friday evening to a crest of 23.7 feet Saturday evening. It will
  then fall below flood stage early Sunday afternoon.
* Impact...At 23.0 feet, minor lowland flooding.  Move livestock and
  equipment to higher ground.

&&

LAT...LON 3263 9535 3257 9509 3253 9508 3254 9521
      3257 9535

$$

19

==== Example of a flood statement ====
000
WGUS84 KMRX 221008
FLSMRX
FLOOD STATEMENT
NATIONAL WEATHER SERVICE MORRISTOWN, TN 
608 AM EDT TUE SEP 22 2009

...THE FLOOD WARNING CONTINUES FOR THE FOLLOWING RIVERS IN GEORGIA...
TENNESSEE...
  SOUTH CHICKAMAUGA CREEK @ CHICKAMAUGA TN AFFECTING CATOOSA AND
HAMILTON COUNTIES 
 
IN HAMILTON COUNTY...THERE ARE TOO MANY STREETS CLOSED TO MENTION.
IN SHORT...BE PREPARED FOR LONG DELAYS. ALSO...FAR TOO MANY PEOPLE
ARE TRYING TO DRIVE THROUGH FLOOD WATERS. THIS IS A GOOD WAY TO DIE.

PRECAUTIONARY/PREPAREDNESS ACTIONS...

MOST DEATHS IN FLOODS OCCUR IN CARS! IF YOU COME TO A CLOSED OR
FLOODED ROAD, TURN AROUND! DON'T DROWN! DRIVING INTO FLOODED ROADS
IS A GOOD WAY TO DIE. BETTER TO BE LATE THAN END UP ON THE NEWS.

&&

GAC047-TNC065-221608-
/O.CON.KMRX.FL.W.0013.000000T0000Z-090923T1942Z/
/CHKT1.2.ER.090921T0923Z.090922T1800Z.090923T1342Z.NO/
608 AM EDT TUE SEP 22 2009

THE FLOOD WARNING CONTINUES FOR
  THE SOUTH CHICKAMAUGA CREEK @ CHICKAMAUGA TN
* UNTIL WEDNESDAY AFTERNOON.
* AT  5:15 AM TUESDAY THE STAGE WAS 25.8 FEET.
* MODERATE FLOODING IS OCCURRING. THE FORECAST IS FOR MODERATE 
  FLOODING TO CONTINUE.
* FORECAST...THE RIVER WILL CONTINUE TO RISE AND CREST NEAR 26.5 FEET
  TUESDAY AFTERNOON. THE RIVER WILL FALL BELOW FLOOD STAGE LATE
  WEDNESDAY MORNING.
* AT 27.0 FEET...HOMES ON ARLENA CIRCLE (OFF SHALLOWFORD ROAD) ARE 
  EVACUATED.  EVACUATIONS ALSO TAKE PLACE AT THE FOUNTAINBLEAU 
  APARTMENTS ON SPRING CREEK ROAD IN EAST RIDGE.

$$

$$

BOYD

=== Iowa Flood Center ===
The Iowa Flood Center at the University of Iowa operates the largest real-time flood monitoring system of its kind in the world. It includes more than 200 real-time stream stage sensors that feed data into the Iowa Flood Information System where data can be viewed, online, by disaster management staff and the general public. The stream stage sensors, mounted on bridges and culverts, use ultrasonic sensors to monitor stream and river levels. The Iowa Flood Information System is considered "one of the best in the country", according to the Washington Post.

=== Australia ===
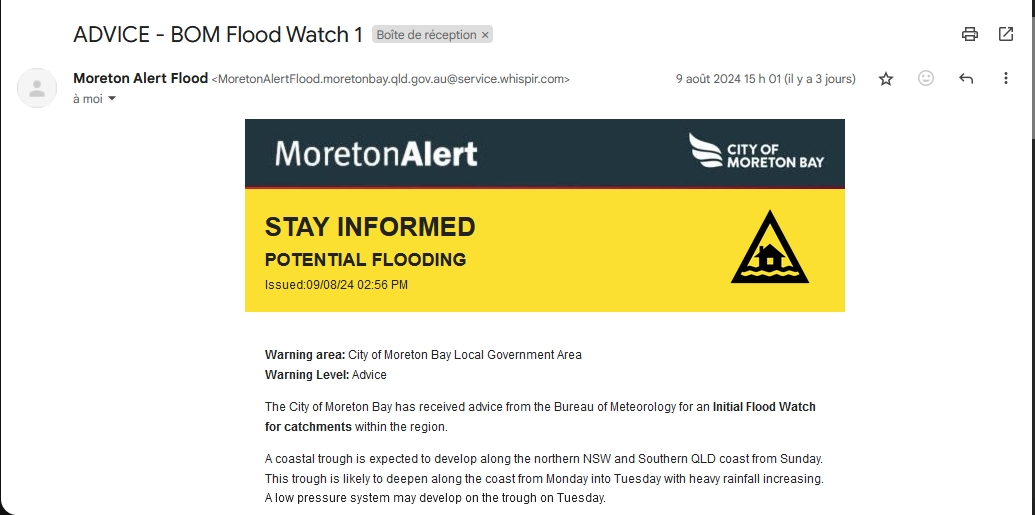
An Email transmitted by the Moreton Bay council advising people of a flood watch warning.

In Australia, flood warnings are handled by the Bureau Of Meteorology as well as local councils. The method of distributing the warning can vary but is usually transmitted by radio, social media and dedicated apps.

== In other countries ==
In Canada, a heavy rainfall warning, which indicates rainfall amounts that could produce flooding are expected, has basically the same meaning as a flood watch.

In Europe, there is the European Flood Awareness System and the commercial product including app and data services FloodAlert.
