= 2023 Fort Lauderdale floods =

Extreme weather event

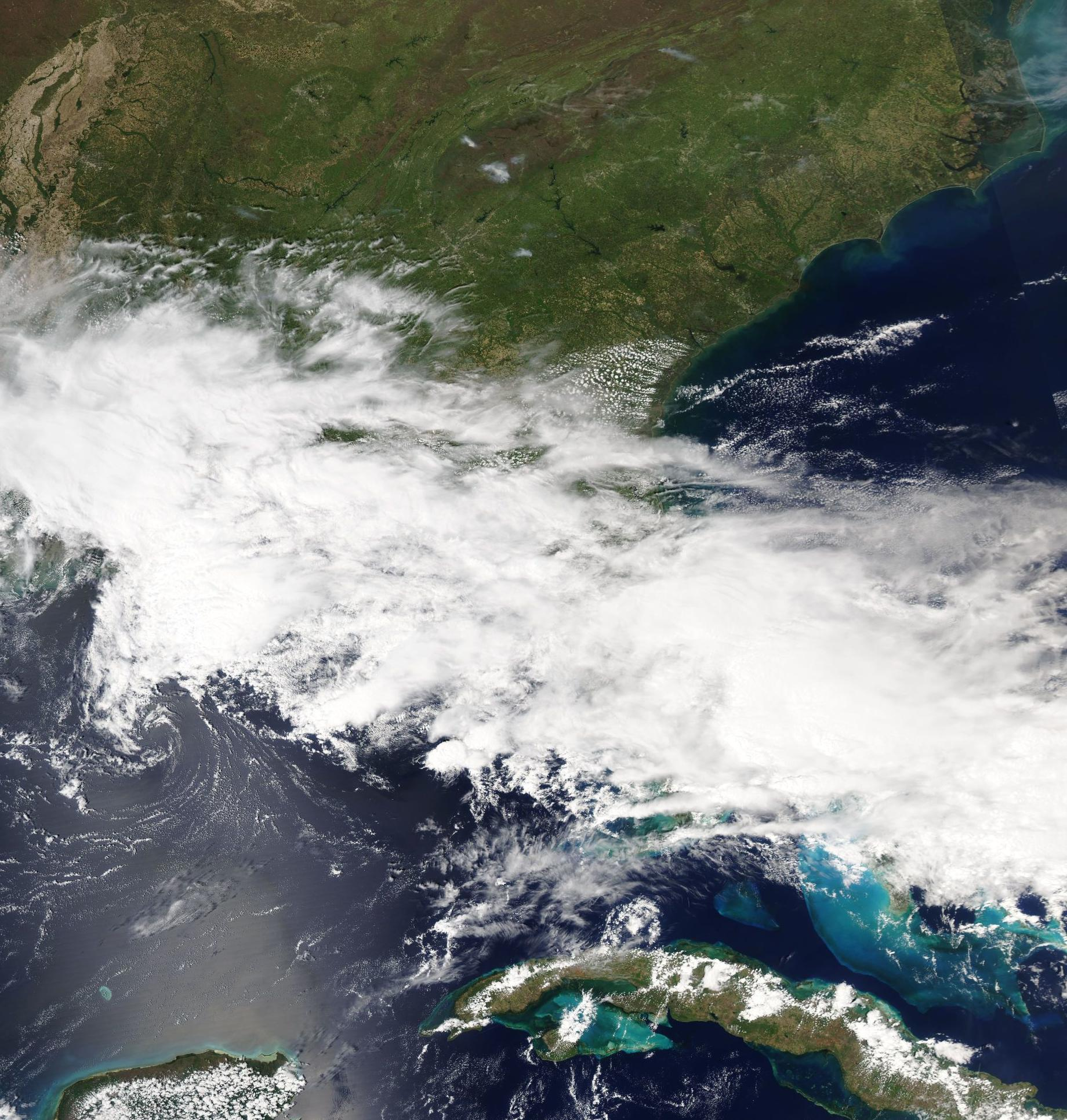
- The storm system responsible for the floods in Fort Lauderdale from April 12 through April 13, 2023

Meteorological history
- Duration: 12 – 13 April 2023

Flood
- Max. rainfall: 25.91 inches (658 mm)

Overall effects
- Fatalities: None
- Damage: $1.1 billion (2023 USD)
- Areas affected: Fort Lauderdale, Dania Beach, Hollywood and South Miami in Florida

A historic flash flood event occurred in Fort Lauderdale, Florida, and the surrounding areas on April 12, 2023. The Fort Lauderdale area reported 25.6 inches (650 mm) of rain within approximately 12 hours. 21.42 in (544 mm) of rain fell in nearby Dania Beach. Other affected areas, such as Hollywood and South Miami, recorded at least 9 in (230 mm) of rain. Fort Lauderdale mayor Dean Trantalis issued a state of emergency due to the flooding.

== Meteorological background ==
The flooding rainfall in eastern Broward County, Florida, spanning from the midday hours of April 12 to roughly midnight on April 13, was supported by the combination of a weather front that was moving slowly through South Florida, and an intensifying area of low pressure in the Gulf of Mexico. The Weather Prediction Center (WPC) wrote in its Excessive Rainfall Discussion, that was issued on April 10, that, "...it anticipated that atmospheric conditions supportive of flash flooding in the Florida peninsula would persist into April 12, highlighting a "Marginal Risk" of flash flooding for urban areas along the coast of southeastern Florida...". The WPC later upgraded the risk to a "Slight Risk", as the confidence increased in the potential for flash flooding, exacerbated by heavy antecedent rainfall on April 11. A flood watch was issued for southeastern Florida during this time. Rainfall spread across south central Florida, throughout the morning of April 12. This was happening in advance of a slow, northward-progressing warm front. The local atmospheric environment was conducive to heavier precipitation rates, bearing precipitable water amounts near the climatological maxima for the region (approximately 1.7–1.9 in (43–48 mm)). Heavier showers and thunderstorms embedded in the largely stratiform rains grew during the morning. The combination of the morning rainfall and rain from preceding days saturated the soils in Broward and Miami-Dade counties to the point that only 1.5–2.0 in (38–51 mm) of rain would need to fall in an hour to produce flash flooding according to flash flood guidance.

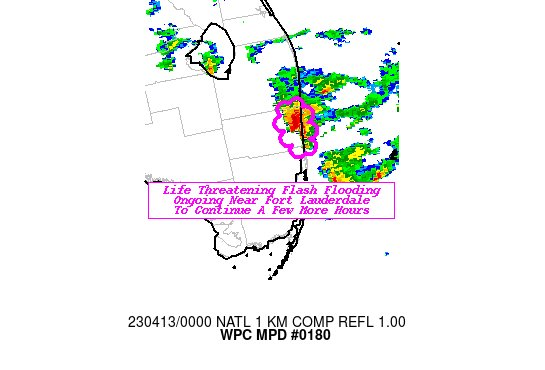
Graphic published by the Weather Prediction Center highlighting the storms on weather radar

The moist conditions persisted into the afternoon and evening, enabling the highly efficient production of rainfall in the storms as the warm front progressed north of Key Largo and into the Miami area. By around 5:30 p.m. EDT, 2–6 in (51–152 mm) of rain had fallen across the Miami metropolitan area. During the evening hours, stationary thunderstorms caused torrential rainfall over Fort Lauderdale, fueled by the locally moist atmosphere and a persistent inflow drawing moisture from the Atlantic towards the Florida coast. National Weather Service Miami, Florida, issued a flash flood emergency at 7:58 p.m. EDT for Fort Lauderdale and Hollywood highlighting the potential for 2–4 in (51–102 mm) of additional rainfall atop the 10–12 in (250–300 mm) of rain that had already fallen. The cluster of storms began to weaken by around 11:00 p.m. EDT after dropping 10–20 in (250–510 mm) of rain in the Fort Lauderdale area. The day's storms also produced two brief tornadoes in Broward County, each producing EF0-rated damage; the first one touched down near West Hollywood at 3:26 p.m. EDT while the second touched down near Dania Beach at 9:41 p.m. EDT. The combination of wind shear, interaction between the warm front and the coast, and enhanced convection and vorticity resulting from the aggregation of thunderstorms may have produced conducive conditions for the development of tornadoes.

== Impact ==
Total precipitation of affected areas from April 12, 2023
Location	Amount
Fort Lauderdale	25.91 inches (658 mm)
Hollywood	18.16 inches (461 mm)
Dania Beach	17.30 inches (439 mm)
Plantation	15.06 inches (383 mm)
Coconut Grove	13.15 inches (334 mm)

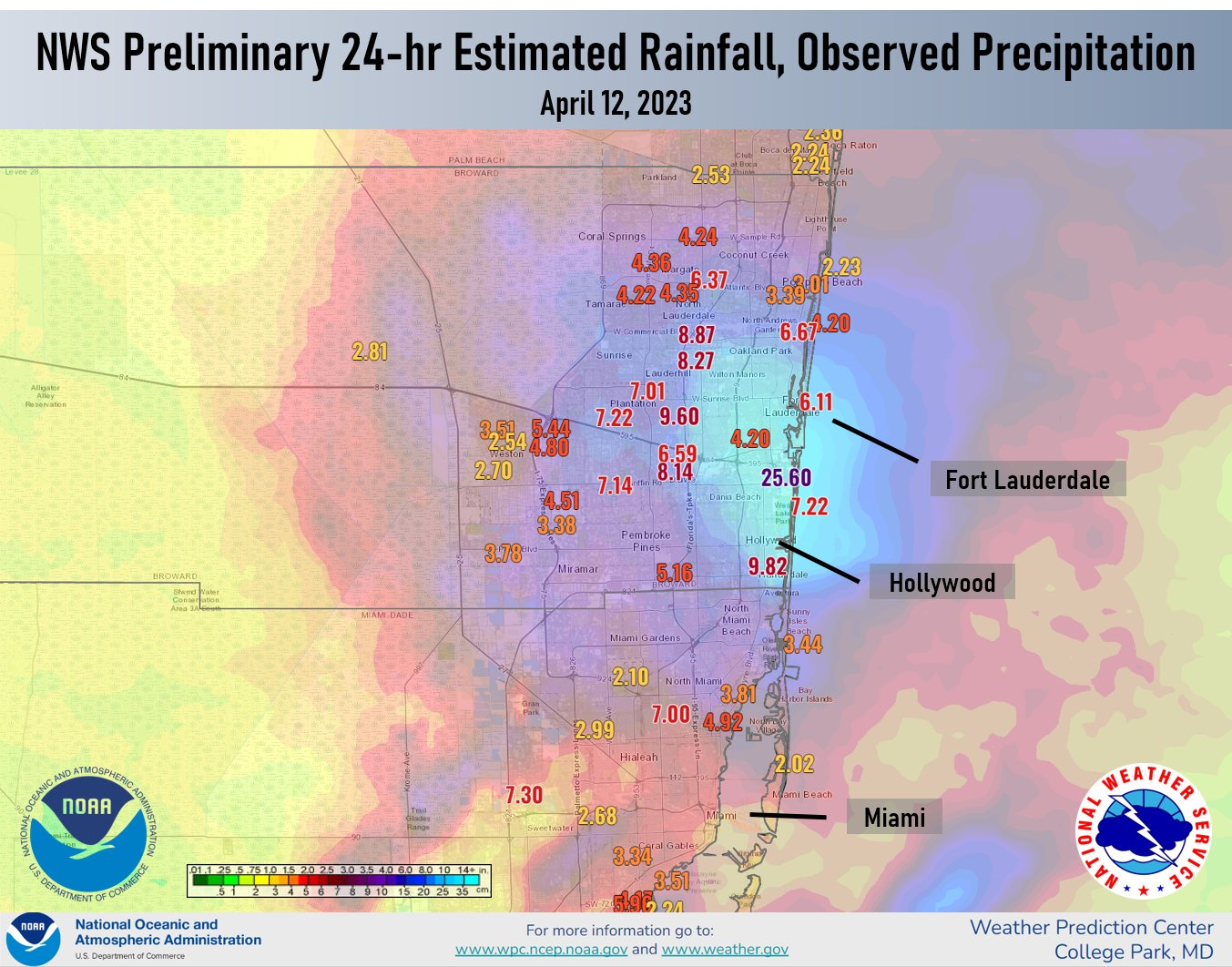
The National Weather Service's preliminary 24-hour estimated rainfall and observed precipitation for April 12, 2023

Over 20 in (510 mm) of rain fell on Fort Lauderdale–Hollywood International Airport. The 25.91 in (658 mm) of rain measured at the airport was the most ever observed in Fort Lauderdale in a single day, eclipsing the previous record of 14.59 in (371 mm) set on April 25, 1979. The daily total was roughly equivalent to a third of the city's annual rainfall and seven times the typical April total, exceeding the 19.47 in (495 mm) of rain that fell in April 1979, Fort Lauderdale's previous wettest April on record. To the south of the city, a nearby swath of rainfall totals between 15–20 in (380–510 mm) spanned from Hollywood to Dania Beach. During the most intense rainfall on the evening of April 12, rainfall rates exceeded 3–4 in (76–102 mm) per hour, comparable to the average April rainfall total; the extreme rainfall rates were at the level of a 1-in-1000 year event. Rainfall amounts tapered to the south, with totals of 3–5 in (76–127 mm) in Miami proper, though Miami's Coconut Grove neighborhood saw over 13 in (330 mm) of rain between April 12 and April 13. Floodwater depths exceeded 3 ft (0.91 m) near Floyd Hull Stadium in Fort Lauderdale. The flood inundation near and north of downtown Fort Lauderdale reached depths of 1–2 ft (0.30–0.61 m).

Over 900 calls were received by the Fort Lauderdale Fire-Rescue Department during the storm, with the Broward County Sheriff's Office assisting in roughly 300 of those calls. Streets in Fort Lauderdale remained impassable on April 13 due to slow flood drainage. Several exits along I-95 were closed by Florida Highway Patrol, along with a tunnel closure in Fort Lauderdale. Schools were closed in Broward County on April 13 as a result of the flood. The County later extended the closure until Monday, April 17 after announcing at least $2 million in damages to its schools across Fort Lauderdale, Dania Beach, Hollywood, Hallandale Beach, and Oakland Park. The Fort Lauderdale City Hall was also closed. Hundreds of cars were reported stranded in floodwaters. The roof of a shopping center in Fort Lauderdale collapsed during the storm. A weak EF0 tornado caused minimal tree damage in West Hollywood while a high-end EF0 tornado in Dania Beach damaged trees and a mobile home park. Brightline trains were suspended from Fort Lauderdale to Miami. There were two lightning delays at Miami International Airport on April 13. A parking lot at Florida International University was flooded. There were more than 22,000 power outages.

=== Fort Lauderdale-Hollywood International Airport ===
After 25.91 in (658 mm) of rain at the airport on April 12, debris and floodwaters inundated the runways and prompted the temporary closure of Fort Lauderdale–Hollywood International Airport. The airport closed from just after 4 p.m. EDT on April 12 until April 14 at 9 a.m. EDT. Passengers were instructed not to attempt to enter or leave the airport due to flooded roadways. At least 1,119 flights were cancelled due to the flooding, including 207 on April 12, 659 on April 13, and 253 on April 14, affecting 64,000 passengers.

== Rescue efforts ==
Prior to the storm landing in Florida, many services such as American Red Cross opened shelters in area such as Holiday Park for those affected by the floods. Additionally, the Florida Division of Emergency Management (FEDM) and Broward Sheriff's Office Fire Rescue Department deployed staff to the affected areas. Due to high waters blocking streets, rescue craft and aquatic vehicles where employed to rescue survivors. About 600 residents took shelter in Holiday Park. Some residents in the Edgewood neighborhood of southwest Fort Lauderdale required water rescues, with one resident reporting nearly 3 ft (0.91 m) of water in their home. A local towing company reported receiving nearly 500 calls for service through April 13. Two firefighters were slightly injured by electricity in standing floodwaters during search and rescue operations. Crews in Fort Lauderdale worked to clear drains and deploy pumps.

== Aftermath ==
=== Gas shortages ===
Following the storm, Port Everglades, which handles 40% of Florida's gasoline distribution across 12 counties, announced that the flooding had disrupted operations. By April 14, two days after the storm had passed, many gas stations in South Florida had run out of pre-storm supplies, and long lines had started to form at the few that remained open. By April 18, many remained closed because of panic sales and a shortage of truck drivers, and the FEDM announced that 500,000 gallons of emergency fuel would be arriving by April 19. Customers reported wait times over 30 minutes and lines as long as 70 cars at stations nearly a week after the storm. On April 28, U.S. President Joe Biden signed a disaster declaration after Florida governor Ron DeSantis requested one on April 22.

== See also ==
- Weather of 2023
- 1947 Florida–Georgia hurricane – Generated 11 in (280 mm) of rain in three hours in Fort Lauderdale, causing similar flooding
- June 2024 South Florida floods – A similar rainstorm across the region bringing record breaking rains
