= Flash flood guidance system =

The flash flood guidance system (FFGS) was designed and developed by the Hydrologic Research Center, a non-profit public-benefit corporation located in San Diego, CA, US, for use by meteorological and hydrologic forecasters throughout the world. The primary purpose of the FFGS is to provide operational forecasters and disaster management agencies with real-time information pertaining to the threat of small-scale flash flooding throughout a specified region.

The FFGS provides flood warnings based on remote-sensed precipitation (e.g., radar and satellite-based rainfall estimates) and hydrologic models. It supports the analysis of weather-related events that can initiate flash floods (e.g., heavy rainfall, rainfall on saturated soils) and incorporates adjustments based on local weather information. The system supports evaluations of the threat of flash flooding over hourly to six-hourly time scales for stream basins that range in size from 25 to 200 km^{2} in size.

== Technical elements ==
Important technical elements of the flash flood guidance system are the development and use of a bias-corrected radar and/or satellite precipitation estimate field and the use of land-surface hydrologic modeling. The system then provides information on rainfall and hydrologic response, the two important factors in determining the potential for a flash flood. The system is based on the concept of flash flood guidance and flash flood threat. Both indices provide the user with the information needed to evaluate the potential for a flash flood, including assessing the uncertainty associated with the data.

- Flash Flood Guidance is the amount of rainfall of a given duration over a small stream basin needed to create minor flooding (bankfull) conditions at the outlet of the stream basin. For flash flood occurrence, durations up to six hours are evaluated and the stream basin areas are of such a size to allow reasonably accurate precipitation estimates from remotely sensed data and in-situ data. Flash flood guidance then is an index that indicates how much rainfall is needed to overcome soil and channel storage capacities and to cause minimal flooding in a basin.
- Flash Flood Threat is the amount of rainfall of a given duration in excess of the corresponding Flash Flood Guidance value. The flash flood threat when used with existing or forecast rainfall then is an index that provides an indication of areas where flooding is imminent or occurring and where immediate action is or will be shortly needed.

== Background and scientific basis ==
In February 2009, a memorandum of understanding was signed among the World Meteorological Organization, the US Agency for International Development/Office of U.S. Foreign Disaster Assistance, the US National Oceanic and Atmospheric Administration/National Weather Service, and the Hydrologic Research Center to work together under a cooperative initiative to implement the FFG system worldwide. The MOU is in effect through 2017. So far, the countries with FFG systems implemented under this MOU include:

- Seven countries in Central America (satellite precipitation-based system);
- Four riparian countries of the Lower Mekong River basin (satellite precipitation-based system);
- Haiti/Dominican Republic (satellite precipitation-based system);
- Pakistan (satellite precipitation-based system);
- Eight countries of the Black Sea Middle East region (satellite precipitation - and multiple radar precipitation-based system);
- Seven countries of Southern Africa (satellite precipitation-based system); and,
- Chiapas, México (single radar precipitation-based system).

Other FFG implementations (not under the MoU) include:

- Romania (multiple radar precipitation-based system); and,
- Republic of South Africa (satellite precipitation - and multiple radar precipitation-based system).

More than 2.2 billion people are served by these operational systems.

Short-term operational prediction of flash floods is different from that of large river floods in several aspects (Table 1). Notably, short lead times for forecast, warning and response make operational flash flood prediction challenging, while they also make it a hydrometeorological problem (rather than a purely hydrological prediction problem). Furthermore, their potential occurrence at any time during a day or night also necessitates 24x7 operations for flash flood forecasting and warning.

The flash flood guidance approach to developing flash flood warnings rests on the real-time comparison of observed or forecast rainfall volume of a given duration and over a given catchment to a characteristic volume of rainfall for that duration and catchment that generates bank full flow conditions at the catchment outlet. If the observed or forecast rainfall volume is greater than the characteristic rainfall volume then flooding in the catchment is likely. The characteristic rainfall volume for a particular catchment and duration, called "flash flood guidance", depends on the catchment and drainage network characteristics, and the soil water deficit determined by antecedent rainfall, evapotranspiration and groundwater loss.

The flash flood guidance approach addresses the special requirements of operational flash flood prediction, and it differs fundamentally from usual hydrometeorological modeling approaches, notably distributed hydrological modeling. Table 2 highlights the differences between these two approaches. The ability provided by the flash flood guidance approach for local adjustments. These adjustments are necessary for reliable operational flash flood prediction on small scales, as previous studies have shown increasing uncertainty associated with even the simulations (rather than predictions) of distributed hydrological models with decreasing catchment area when operationally available data are used.

Table 1: Differences in the operational prediction of large-river floods and flash floods

Large-River Floods	Flash Floods
Catchment response affords long lead times	Catchment response is very fast and allows very short lead times
Entire hydrographs can be produced with low uncertainty with good quality data	Prediction of occurrence is of primary interest
Local information less valuable	Local information is very valuable
Hydrologic forecasting problem primarily	A truly hydrometeorological forecasting problem
Affords time for coordination of flood response and damage mitigation	Coordination of forecasting and response is challenging in real-time with careful planning and coordination between forecast and disaster management agencies is necessary

Table 2: Differences between distributed hydrometeorological modeling and flash flood guidance approaches

Distributed modeling	Flash flood guidance
Tool for short and long term forecasting of floods	Diagnostic tool useful for quick flash flood diagnosis and short term prediction of occurrence
Entire hydrographs can be produced with high uncertainty on small scales	Estimates bankfull flows only and uses them for threat prediction
Difficult to ingest local precipitation information after model cycle	Readily ingests up-to-the-minute local precipitation information
Awkward for local users to make adjustments needed for local flash flood warning	Design facilitates and encourages local user adjustments are easy to make
Expensive to run in real time for very large areas with high resolution	Can look at all flash flood prone basins over large areas cost effectively

The scientific components of the flash flood guidance system use the available real-time data from in-situ gauging stations and from remote sensing platforms, suitably adjusted to reduce bias, together with physically or conceptually based soil water accounting models to produce flash flood guidance estimates of various durations over small flash-flood-prone catchments.

At first, under soil saturated conditions the rainfall of a given duration that causes the surface runoff peak from the stream basin to produce bank full flow at the catchment outlet is estimated. Then, the soil water deficit is computed at the current time from available data, and the transformation of the rainfall required to produce bank full flow at the stream outlet under saturated soil conditions to that needed for the current soil water deficit (i.e., the flash flood guidance) is made. The estimation of soil water deficit requires good quality input data, and; with radar and satellite data, an adaptive state estimator is employed to reduce bias through the use of data from real time reporting rain gauges.

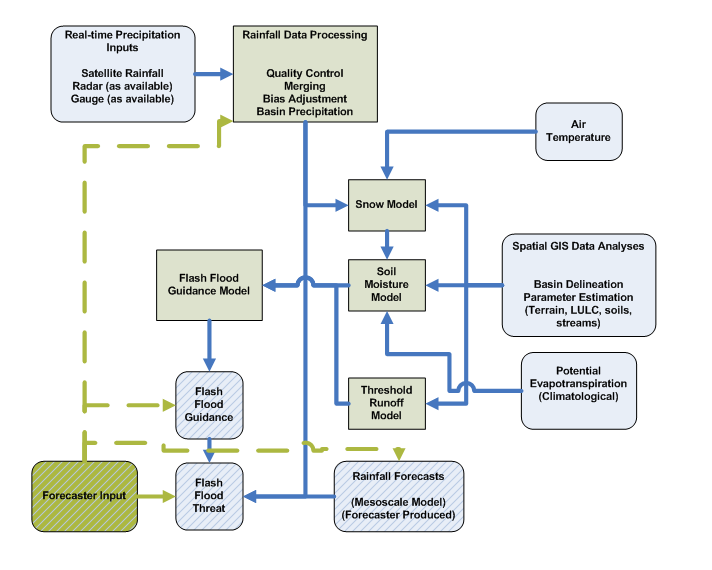
The key technical components of the FFG system are shown in the following schematic.

FFG system technical components

Forecaster products The types of products available to forecaster vary by FFGS based on needs and requirements. Below is a typical forecaster user interface.

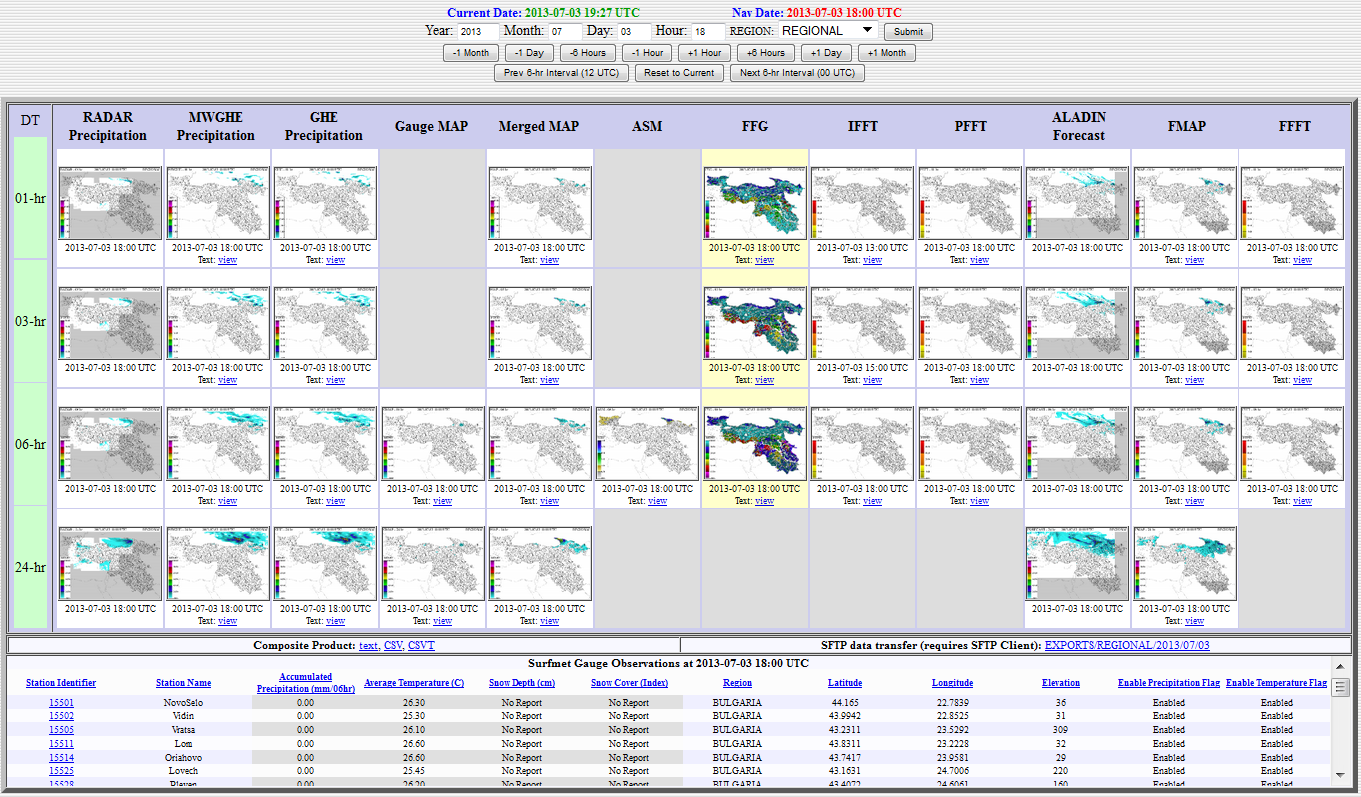
Flash flood guidance interface

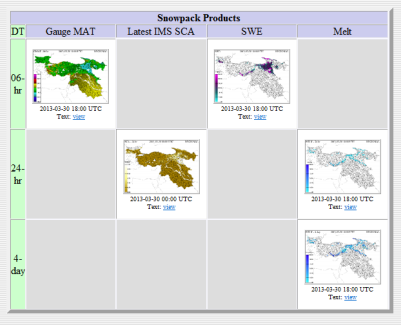
FFG system interface snow products

The types of products available to a forecaster through this interface include the following:

- RADAR Precipitation – Radar-based precipitation estimates
- MWGHE Precipitation – Satellite-based precipitation estimates (U.S. NOAA-NESDIS global hydroestimator (infrared-based) and adjusted by the U.S. NOAA-CPC CMORPH microwave-based satellite rainfall product)
- GHE Precipitation – U.S. NOAA-NESDIS Global HydroEstimatOR SATELLITE PRECIPITation estimates
- Gauge MAP – Gauge-based mean areal precipitation (MAP) for stream basin areas
- Merged MAP – Merged mean areal precipitation for stream basin areas (Best available mean areal precipitation estimates from bias-adjusted RADAR or bias-adjusted MWGHE or bias-adjusted GHE or the gauge-interpolations)
- ASM – Average soil moisture (model-based)
- FFG – Flash flood guidance
- IFFT – Imminent flash flood threat (a current “observation” of flash flood threat)
- PFFT – Persistence flash flood threat (a “forecast” of flash flood threat with persistence used as the rainfall forecast)
- ALADIN forecast – Quantitative precipitation forecast (in this example from the ALADIN mesoscale model)
- FMAP – Forecast mean areal precipitation for stream basin areas (using mesoscale model rainfall forecasts)
- FFFT – Forecast flash flood threat (using mesoscale model rainfall forecasts)
- Gauge MAT – Gauge-based mean areal temperature for stream basin areas
- Latest IMS SCA – Fraction of stream basin area snow cover (from U.S. NOAA-NESDIS)
- SWE – Model-based snow water equivalent for stream basin areas (reflects the state of the snowpack)
- Melt – Snow melt (cumulative melt over the period of 24–96 hours for each stream basin area)
- SurfMet gauge stations – surface meteorological stations available

The products from the FFG system are designed to be evaluated, interpreted, adjusted and used by operators with meteorological and/or hydrologic expertise.

== See also ==
- Flash flood
- Hydrology
- Meteorology
- Flash flood watch
- Flash flood warning
