= June 2024 South Florida floods =

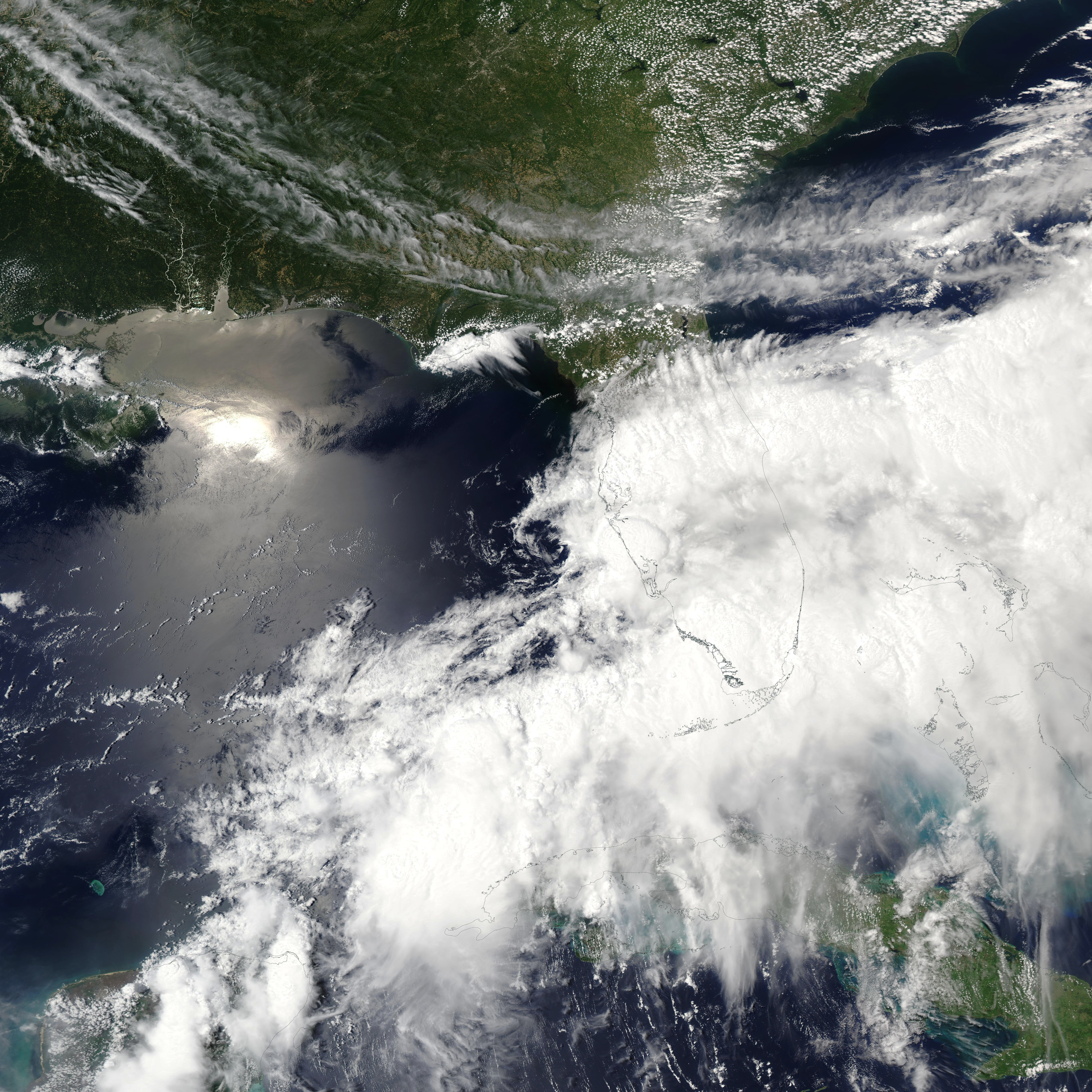
- Invest 90L shortly before it made landfall in Florida on June 11
- Cause: Tropical wave

Meteorological history
- Duration: June 11–14, 2024

Flood
- Max. rainfall: 27.95 in (710 mm) in Big Cypress National Preserve

Overall effects
- Damage: >$100 million
- Areas affected: South Florida

From June 11 through June 14, 2024, heavy rainfall lead to flooding across South Florida caused by a trough of low pressure over the eastern Gulf of Mexico. The rainfall broke several records across the region. Due to a possibility that the system could develop into a tropical cyclone, the National Hurricane Center designated it Invest 90L.

== Meteorological history ==
On June 11, the National Hurricane Center (NHC) began monitoring a trough of low pressure over the Eastern Gulf of Mexico that was expected to produce heavy rainfall over the state of Florida. Later that day, it was designated as Invest 90L, allowing for greater monitoring of the system. The invest then moved over Florida. On June 13, the low pressure moved off the Eastern Florida coast. By June 15, the system had merged with a frontal boundary.

As the disturbance moved over Florida on June 11, deep moisture and convection with "anomalous" precipitable water values over 2.25–2.5 in (57–64 mm), as strong influx of low-level moisture took place. Later in the day, rainfall rates have been as high as 4 in (100 mm) per hour due to precipitable water values going over 2.5 in (64 mm), a strong low-level jet with winds over 30 kn (35 mph; 56 km/h), and convective available potential energy (CAPE) over 1500 J/Kg, which caused a high risk of flash and urban flooding across much of southern Florida.

== Preparations ==
Prior to the rainfall, Western Florida was experiencing a drought.

Several counties had states of emergencies declared for them by Governor Ron DeSantis along with Fort Lauderdale, Hollywood, and Miami-Dade County by their own leaders. The National Weather Service declared a flash flood emergency. Fort Lauderdale and Miami Beach opened sites to distribute sandbags. Over 100 pumps were set up on June 10.

The northwest of the Bahamas was placed under flood watch from June 12 to June 14.

== Impacts ==
Multiple cities recorded over 15 in (380 mm) of rain from the system. Fort Lauderdale received the average monthly amount of rain for June in 24 hours on June 12, the wettest day in the city recorded in June. Throughout the whole event, Fort Lauderdale received over 20 in (510 mm) of rain. From June 12 to June 15, Big Cypress National Preserve received just under 28 in (710 mm) of rain. Northeast Miami-Dade County received over 22 in (560 mm). On June 12, various places in Sarasota County, just south of Tampa Bay, recorded 3 hour rainfall totals of 8 in (200 mm). Rainfall of this magnitude can be expected to hit this area once every 500 to 1000 years, and the storm represented the first of four flooding events for the area in a four month period (including Tropical Storm Debby, Hurricane Helene, and Hurricane Milton). Farther south, Fort Myers recorded 5.44 in (138 mm) of rain, the most recorded there in a 24 hour span.

The South Florida Water Management District set up five temporary pumps in Miami Beach and along the Miami River.

I-95 southbound in Broward County had to be rerouted to avoid a flooded section of the route. Hundreds of flights were cancelled and delayed across South Florida. Flights were delayed on average seven hours according to the FAA. Half of the flights at Fort Lauderdale–Hollywood International Airport were delayed or cancelled. The Florida East Coast Railway, which is used by Brightline, in between Aventura and Miami was flooded.

An EF1 tornado touched down at Hobe Sound in Martin County on June 12. Numerous trees along its path were toppled.

== See also ==
- 2023 Fort Lauderdale floods
- 2024 Rio Grande do Sul floods
- 2024 Atlantic hurricane season
