= Flood forecasting =

Prediction of flooding in a specific area

Flood forecasting is the process of predicting the occurrence, magnitude, timing, and duration of floods in a specific area, often by analysing various hydrological, meteorological, and environmental factors. The primary goal of flood forecasting is to deliver timely and accurate information to decision-makers, empowering them to take appropriate actions to mitigate the potential consequences of flooding on human lives, property, and the environment. By accounting for the various dimensions of a flood event, such as occurrence, magnitude, duration, and spatial extent, flood forecasting models can offer a more holistic and detailed representation of the impending risks and facilitate more effective response strategies.

Flood forecasting is a multifaceted discipline that aims to predict various aspects of flood events, including their occurrence, magnitude, timing, duration, and spatial extent. However, the scope and definition of flood forecasting can differ across scientific publications and methodologies. In some cases, flood forecasting is focused on estimating the moment when a specific threshold in a river system is exceeded, while in other cases, it involves predicting the flood extent and employing hydrodynamic information from models.

When flood forecasting is limited to estimating the moment a threshold is exceeded, researchers often concentrate on predicting water levels or river discharge in a particular location. This approach provides valuable information about the potential onset of a flood event, enabling decision-makers to initiate preventive measures and minimize potential damages. In this context, flood forecasting models are designed to predict when the water level or discharge will surpass a predefined threshold, usually based on historical data and established risk levels.

On the other hand, more comprehensive flood forecasting methods involve predicting the flood extent by utilizing hydrodynamic information from models. These approaches not only consider the exceedance of a threshold but also aim to estimate the spatial distribution, timing and extent of the flooding. Hydrodynamic models, such as the Hydrologic Engineering Center's River Analysis System (HEC-RAS) or the MIKE suite of models, simulate water flow and its interaction with the surrounding environment, providing detailed predictions of flood extent, depth, and velocity.

Incorporating hydrodynamic information into flood forecasting models allows for a more complete understanding of the potential impacts of flood events, accounting for factors such as the inundation of infrastructure, agricultural lands, and residential areas. By considering the spatial distribution of flooding, these models enable more effective flood management and response strategies, ensuring that resources are allocated appropriately and that vulnerable populations are adequately protected.

Flood forecasting can be done using various methodologies, which can be broadly categorized into physically-based models, data-driven models, or a combination of both. The choice of the most suitable approach depends on factors such as data availability, catchment characteristics, and desired prediction accuracy. Here is an overview of each approach:

Physically-based models simulate the underlying physical processes involved in flood generation and propagation, such as precipitation, infiltration, runoff, and routing. These models are typically more stable and reliable due to their inherent representation of the physics, making them less susceptible to forecast errors in comparison to data-driven models, especially in the absence of inputs like rainfall. However, physically-based models are state-dependent and require accurate initial conditions for optimal performance. During the so-called "warming period" of the model, the performance might be lower due to the reliance on initial conditions.

Data-driven models focus on discovering patterns and relationships within historical data without explicitly representing the physical processes. They can learn complex, non-linear relationships and adapt to changing conditions, making them useful in situations where data is abundant and accurate representation of physical processes is challenging. Examples of data-driven models include regression techniques, Artificial Neural Networks (ANN), Support Vector Machines (SVM), and tree-based algorithms like Random Forest or XGBoost.

Hybrid models combine the strengths of physically-based and data-driven models to enhance flood forecasting accuracy and reliability. Hybrid models can utilize the physical understanding from physically-based models while benefiting from the adaptive learning capabilities of data-driven models. An example of a hybrid model is coupling a hydrological model with a machine learning algorithm to improve flood prediction accuracy. Hybrid models may also incorporate physical processes into the structure of the machine learning models.

Flood forecasting can be mathematically represented as:

$\displaystyle F(t)=f(P_t, X_t, H_t, C_t)$

where:

- $F(t)$ is the flood forecast at time $t$,
- $P_t$ represents the precipitation input at time $t$,
- $X_t$ denotes a vector of proxy variables (e.g., soil moisture, land use, topography) at time $t$,
- $H_t$ is the historical data up to time $t$,
- $C_t$ represents the initial conditions and catchment characteristics,
- $f$ is the flood forecasting model, which can be a physically-based model, a data-driven model or a hybrid model depending on the approach chosen.

In many operational systems forecasted precipitation is fed into rainfall-runoff and streamflow routing models to forecast flow rates and water levels for periods ranging from a few hours to days ahead, depending on the size of the watershed or river basin. Flood forecasting can also make use of forecasts of precipitation in an attempt to extend the lead-time available.

Flood forecasting is an important component of flood warning, where the distinction between the two is that the outcome of flood forecasting is a set of forecast time-profiles of channel flows or river levels at various locations, while "flood warning" is the task of making use of these forecasts to tell decisions on warnings of floods.

Real-time flood forecasting at regional area can be done within seconds by using the technology of artificial neural network. Effective real-time flood forecasting models could be useful for early warning and disaster prevention.

== See also ==
- Runoff model (reservoir)
- Flood alert
- Flood Modeller Pro
- Weather forecasting
