= Flood Modeller =

- Developer: Jacobs Engineering Group
- Stable release: 7.0
- Written in: C#, Fortran, Delphi, C++
- Operating system: Microsoft Windows
- Type: Hydraulic simulation, Geographic information system
- Website: https://www.floodmodeller.com/

Flood Modeller is a computer program developed by Jacobs that assesses flood risk by simulating the flow of water through river channels, urban drainage networks and across floodplains using a range of one- and two-dimensional hydraulic solvers. The software incorporates a user interface for building, running and viewing the results of models, including a GIS map interface.

The software has been independently benchmarked by the Environment Agency and is used extensively to undertake modelling of flood risk, develop flood risk management schemes and provide flood forecasting services.

== Development History ==
Initially developed by Halcrow Group and then CH2M Hill, Flood Modeller is now developed by Jacobs Solutions. Flood Modeller was previously known as "ISIS" (after the local name for the Upper Thames).

== Solvers ==
=== 1D solvers ===
Flood Modeller includes steady-state and unsteady 1D river solvers for modelling open-channels.

It also provides a 1D urban solver for modelling urban drainage systems.

=== 2D solvers ===
Flood Modeller includes three different 2D solvers:

- The ADI solver is based on the DIVAST numerical engine first developed in the 1980s, and is designed to simulate fluvial, overland, estuarine and coastal situations where flow does not rapidly change.
- The TVD solver is designed to represent rapid changes in the water surface profile, but results in longer run-times.
- The FAST solver uses simplified hydraulics to perform rapid assessments of flooding.

== Future Development ==
Over the past five decades, flood inundation models have emerged as essential tools for flood forecasting and risk management. Through an analysis of publications from 1970 to 2023, Li & Steve provide a foundational understanding of state-of-the-science flood model developments. The evolution of flood models in recent decades has been marked by significant technological advances, including enhancing traditional numerical modeling approaches and deploying them with widespread use of large-scale simulation and satellite remote sensing. The field has matured substantially over the past 50 years, and it seems to have reached an inflection point at which major research is poised to progress. The most ambitious research directions are those that involve coupling flood models with models in diverse fields and involve: (1) atmospheric sciences to construct a two-way coupled flood-land surface-atmosphere model, (2) epidemiology to assess the health impacts of floods, (3) economics to help develop a flood model damage footprint framework to quantify financial harm to those who occupy urban and agricultural land, (4) ecology to evaluate and quantify flood-induced ecological damage, (5) further development of groundwater flooding, glacial lake outburst flooding, sedimentation-induced flooding, plus investigation of the joint impact of multiple compounding flood types, (6) responsible advancement of AI-based flood models, (7) greater assimilation of multiple data sources that include high resolution satellite and drone imagery, crowdsourcing, and video data. Building on the broad foundation of flood-modeling research conducted over many decades, these eight avenues offer promising opportunities to further address the combined challenges of escalating climate, land-use, and demographic changes.

== See also ==
- Hydrology
- Surface-water hydrology
- Hydrological transport model
- HEC-RAS
- SWMM
- GIS
- CivilGEO
- Computer simulation
