= West Hollywood (Hollywood, Florida) =

- Neighborhood
- Interactive map of West Hollywood
- Coordinates: 26°1′2.63″N 80°13′35.17″W
- State: Florida
- County: Broward
- City: Hollywood
- Elevation: 10 ft (3.0 m)

Population (2000)
  - Total: 60,806
- Time zone: UTC-5 (EST)
  - Summer (DST): UTC-4 (EDT)
- ZIP codes: 33024
- Area code: 954/754

West Hollywood is a neighborhood in Broward County, Florida, United States in the city limits of Hollywood. The latest population for the area recorded was 60,806. West Hollywood reported as an "unincorporated place" by the U.S. Census Bureau in 1950, when the population count totaled 1,196.

== Geography ==
West Hollywood is located at 26.021 degrees north, 80.184 degrees west (26.021, -80.184). The elevation for the community is 10 feet above sea level.

The community is bounded by Davie Road Extension and 72nd avenue, Stirling Road, Florida Turnpike, and Hollywood Boulevard from the West, North, East, and South respectively. This area includes the residential areas of Boulevard Heights and Driftwood.

== Demographics ==
Historical population
Census	Pop.	Note	%±
1950	1,196		—

The median income for the community is $43,113 and the median age is 31.79.

== Education ==
The community of West Hollywood is served by Broward County Public Schools.
