= Flash flood =

Rapid flooding of low-lying areas

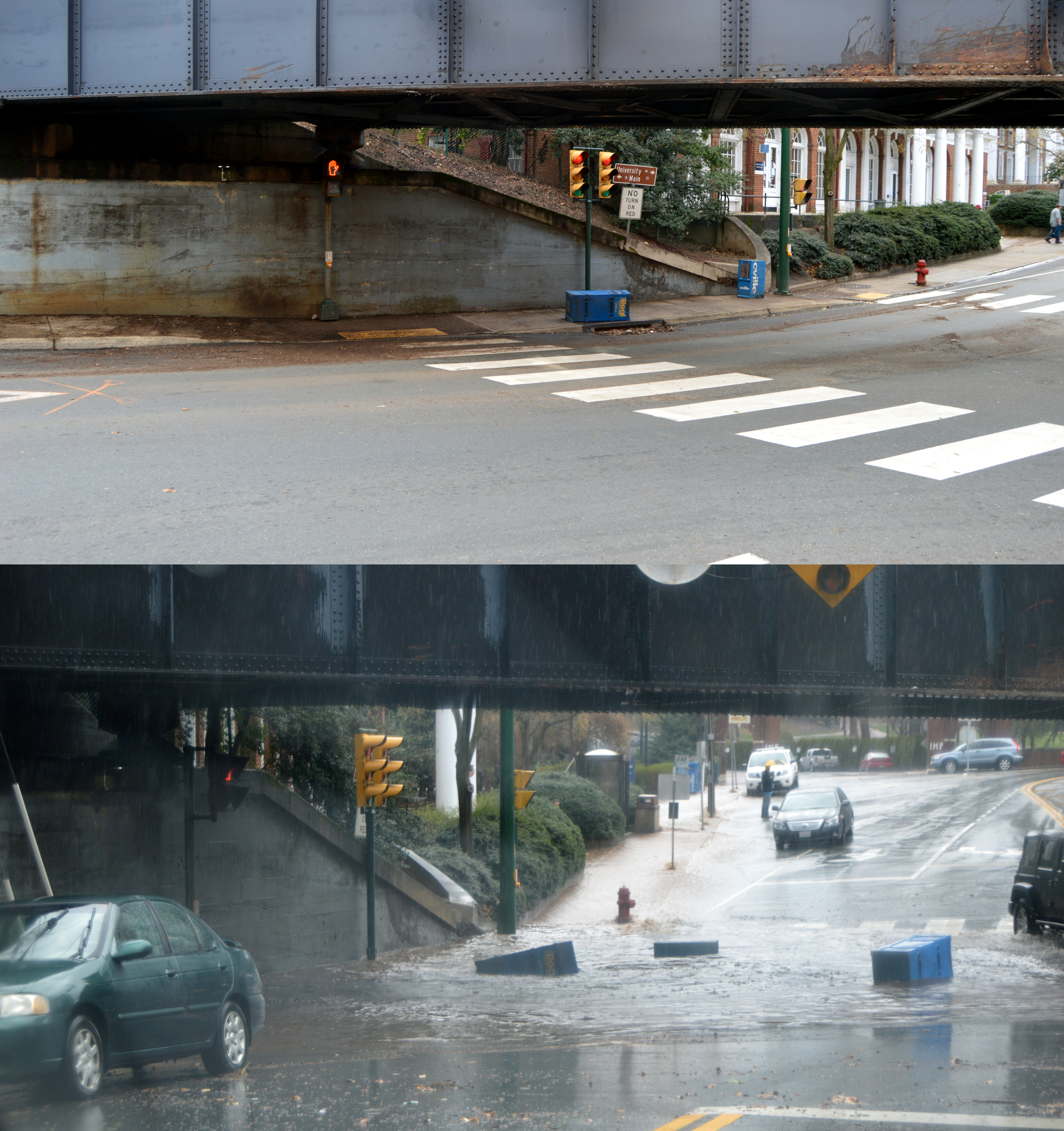
An underpass in Charlottesville, Virginia, United States during normal conditions (upper) and after fifteen minutes of heavy rain (lower) in 2017

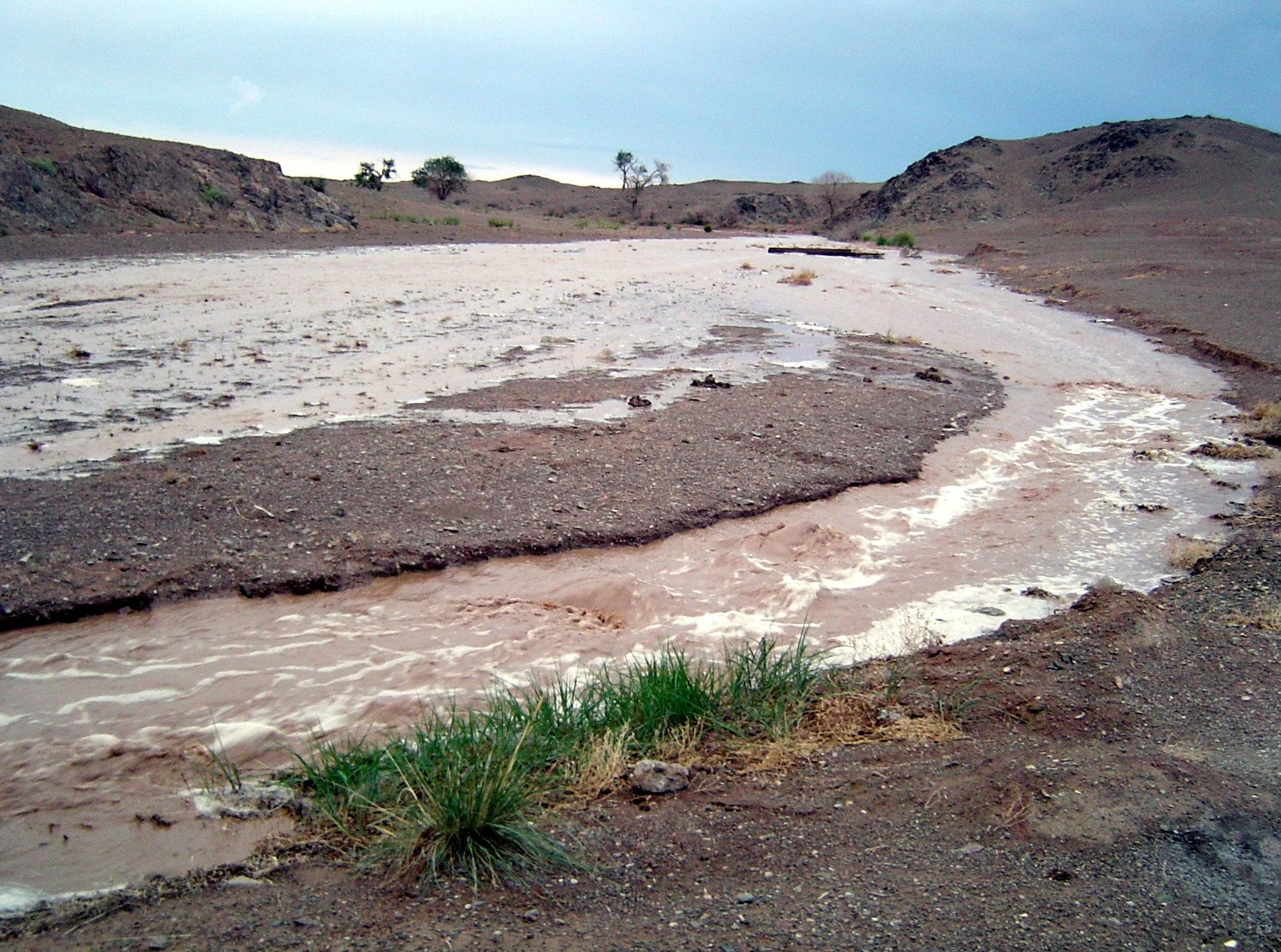
A flash flood after a thunderstorm in the Gobi Desert, Mongolia, in 2004

A flash flood is a rapid flooding of low-lying areas: washes, rivers, dry lakes, and depressions. It may be caused by heavy rain associated with a severe thunderstorm, hurricane, or tropical storm, or by meltwater from ice and snow. Flash floods may also occur after the collapse of a natural ice or debris dam, or a human structure such as a man-made dam, as occurred before the Johnstown Flood of 1889. Flash floods are distinguished from regular floods by having a timescale of fewer than six hours between rainfall and the onset of flooding.

Flash floods are a significant hazard, causing more fatalities in the United States in an average year than lightning, tornadoes, or hurricanes. They can also deposit large quantities of sediments on floodplains and destroy vegetation cover not adapted to frequent flood conditions.

== Causes ==
Flash floods most often occur in dry areas that have recently received precipitation, but they may be seen anywhere downstream from the source of the precipitation, even many miles from the source. In areas on or near volcanoes, flash floods have also occurred after eruptions, when glaciers have been melted by the intense heat. Flash floods are known to occur in the high mountain ranges of the United States and are also common in the arid plains of the Southwestern United States. Flash flooding can also be caused by extensive rainfall released by hurricanes and other tropical storms, as well as the sudden thawing effect of ice dams. Human activities can also cause flash floods to occur. When dams fail, a large quantity of water can be released and destroy everything in its path.

== Hazards ==
The United States National Weather Service gives the advice "Turn Around, Don't Drown" for flash floods; that is, it recommends that people get out of the area of a flash flood, rather than trying to cross it. Many people tend to underestimate the dangers of flash floods. What makes flash floods most dangerous is their sudden nature and fast-moving water. A vehicle provides little to no protection against being swept away; it may make people overconfident and less likely to avoid the flash flood. More than half of the fatalities attributed to flash floods are people swept away in vehicles when trying to cross flooded intersections. As little as 2 feet (0.61 m) of water is enough to carry away most SUV-sized vehicles. The U.S. National Weather Service reported in 2005 that, using a national 30-year average, more people die yearly in floods, 127 on average, than by lightning (73), tornadoes (65), or hurricanes (16).

In deserts, flash floods can be particularly deadly for several reasons. First, storms in arid regions are infrequent, but they can deliver an enormous amount of water in a very short time. Second, these rains often fall on poorly absorbent and often clay-like soil, which greatly increases the amount of runoff that rivers and other water channels have to handle. These regions tend not to have the infrastructure that wetter regions have to divert water from structures and roads, such as storm drains, culverts, and retention basins, either because of sparse population or poverty, or because residents believe the risk of flash floods is not high enough to justify the expense. In fact, in some areas, desert roads frequently cross a dry river and creek beds without bridges. From the driver's perspective, there may be clear weather, when a river unexpectedly forms ahead of or around the vehicle in a matter of seconds. Finally, the lack of regular rain to clear water channels may cause flash floods in deserts to be headed by large amounts of debris, such as rocks, branches, and logs.

Deep slot canyons can be especially dangerous to hikers as they may be flooded by a storm that occurs on a mesa miles away. The flood sweeps through the canyon; the canyon makes it difficult to climb up and out of the way to avoid the flood. For example, a cloudburst in southern Utah on 14 September 2015 resulted in 20 flash flood fatalities, of which seven fatalities occurred at Zion National Park when hikers were trapped by floodwaters in a slot canyon.

== Impacts ==
Flash floods induce severe impacts in both the built and the natural environment. The effects of flash floods can be catastrophic and show extensive diversity, ranging from damages in buildings and infrastructure to impacts on vegetation, human lives and livestock. The effects are particularly difficult to characterize in urban areas.

Researchers have used datasets such as the Severe Hazards Analysis and Verification Experiment (SHAVE) and the U.S. National Weather Service (NWS) Storm Data datasets to connect the impact of flash floods with the physical processes involved in flash flooding. This should increase the reliability of flash flood impact forecasting models. Analysis of flash floods in the United States between 2006 and 2012 shows that injuries and fatalities are most likely in small, rural catchments, that the shortest events are also the most dangerous, that the hazards are greatest after nightfall, and that a very high fraction of injuries and fatalities involve vehicles.

An impact severity scale was proposed in 2020 providing a coherent overview of the flash flood effects through the classification of impact types and severity and mapping their spatial extent in a continuous way across the floodplain. Depending on the affected elements, the flood effects are grouped into 4 categories: (i) impacts on built environment (ii) impacts on man-made mobile objects,(iii) impacts on the natural environment (including vegetation, agriculture, geomorphology, and pollution) and (iv) impacts on the human population (entrapments, injuries, fatalities). The scale was proposed as a tool on prevention planning, as the resulting maps offer insights on future impacts, highlighting the high severity areas.

Flash floods can cause rapid soil erosion. Much of the Nile delta sedimentation may come from flash flooding in the desert areas that drain into the Nile River. However, flash floods of short duration produce relatively little bedrock erosion or channel widening, having their greatest impact from sedimentation on the floodplain.

Some wetland plants, such as certain varieties of rice, are adapted to endure flash flooding. However, plants that thrive in drier areas can be harmed by flooding, as the plants can become stressed by the large amount of water.

== See also ==
- Coastal flood – Type of flooding
- Drowning – Respiratory impairment caused by submersion in liquid
- Flash Flood Alley – Flood-prone region of Texas
- Flash Flood Guidance Systems
- Flash flood warning – Weather warning indicating observed or imminent flash flooding in the area
- Flash flood watch – Weather watch indicating conditions favorable of the development of flash flooding
- Freshet – High water levels caused by melting snow and ice
- Huayco – Andean term for mountain flash floods
- Lifesaving – Act involving rescue, resuscitation, and first aid
- Kalla kadal – Series of waves generated by distant weather systems
- Storm surge – Rise of water associated with a low-pressure weather system
- Jökulhlaup – Type of glacial outburst flood
