= Flash flood watch =

Weather watch indicating conditions favorable of the development of flash flooding

A flash flood watch (SAME code: FFA; also referred as a "green box" by meteorologists) is severe weather watch product of the National Weather Service that is issued when conditions are favorable for flash flooding in flood-prone areas, usually when grounds are already saturated from recent rains, or when upcoming rains will have the potential to cause a flash flood. These watches are also occasionally issued when a dam may break in the near future.

Countries such as Australia also issue similarly worded warnings.

== Example of a flash flood watch ==
Flash Flood Watch for the islands of Hawaii
An example of the EAS activation of a Flash Flood Watch in Maui, HI, issued on January 16, 2024.

Below is an example issued by the National Weather Service in Mount Holly, New Jersey.

688
WGUS61 KPHI 071932
FFAPHI

URGENT - IMMEDIATE BROADCAST REQUESTED
Flood Watch
National Weather Service Mount Holly NJ
332 PM EDT Wed Jul 7 2021

NJZ001-007-PAZ054-055-060>062-080745-
/O.NEW.KPHI.FF.A.0003.210708T1600Z-210709T1600Z/
/00000.0.ER.000000T0000Z.000000T0000Z.000000T0000Z.OO/
Sussex-Warren-Carbon-Monroe-Berks-Lehigh-Northampton-
Including the cities of Jim Thorpe, Allentown, Newton, Washington,
Bethlehem, Stroudsburg, Reading, and Easton
332 PM EDT Wed Jul 7 2021

...FLASH FLOOD WATCH IN EFFECT FROM THURSDAY AFTERNOON THROUGH
FRIDAY MORNING...

The National Weather Service in Mount Holly has issued a

* Flash Flood Watch for portions of northern New Jersey...and
  Pennsylvania...including the following areas...in northern New
  Jersey...Sussex and Warren. In Pennsylvania...Berks, Carbon,
  Lehigh, Monroe, and Northampton.

* From Thursday afternoon through Friday morning.

* Heavy rainfall will develop over portions of eastern PA and NW New
  Jersey ahead of Tropical Storm Elsa Thursday afternoon. The heavy
  rains will see 1 to 2 inches with locally higher amounts and then
  will see another 1 to 2 inches with the heavy rainfall associated
  with Tropical Storm Elsa Thursday evening through the overnight
  hours.

* Heavy rain in short periods of time will cause the potential for
  streams and creeks to quickly rise out of their banks as well as
  the potential for flash flooding in areas of poor drainage.

$$

DEZ001>004-MDZ012-015-019-020-NJZ008>010-012>027-PAZ070-071-101>106-
080745-
/O.NEW.KPHI.FF.A.0003.210708T2100Z-210709T1600Z/
/00000.0.ER.000000T0000Z.000000T0000Z.000000T0000Z.OO/
New Castle-Kent-Inland Sussex-Delaware Beaches-Kent MD-Queen Annes-
Talbot-Caroline-Morris-Hunterdon-Somerset-Middlesex-Western Monmouth-
Eastern Monmouth-Mercer-Salem-Gloucester-Camden-Northwestern
Burlington-Ocean-Cumberland-Atlantic-Cape May-Atlantic Coastal Cape
May-Coastal Atlantic-Coastal Ocean-Southeastern Burlington-Delaware-
Philadelphia-Western Chester-Eastern Chester-Western Montgomery-
Eastern Montgomery-Upper Bucks-Lower Bucks-
Including the cities of Glassboro, Denton, Jackson, Flemington,
Media, Philadelphia, Doylestown, Chalfont, Morristown, Pennsville,
Honey Brook, Centreville, Norristown, Georgetown, Mount Holly, Ocean
City, Cherry Hill, Moorestown, Freehold, Pottstown, Hammonton, Cape
May Court House, Oxford, Kennett Square, Sandy Hook, Chestertown,
Morrisville, West Chester, Millville, Wilmington, New Brunswick,
Dover, Trenton, Lansdale, Wharton State Forest, Atlantic City,
Collegeville, Long Beach Island, Camden, Easton, Perkasie, Rehoboth
Beach, and Somerville
332 PM EDT Wed Jul 7 2021

...FLASH FLOOD WATCH IN EFFECT FROM THURSDAY AFTERNOON THROUGH
FRIDAY MORNING...

The National Weather Service in Mount Holly has issued a

* Flash Flood Watch for portions of Delaware...northeast Maryland...
  New Jersey...and southeast Pennsylvania...including the following
  areas...in Delaware...Delaware Beaches, Inland Sussex, Kent, and
  New Castle. In northeast Maryland...Caroline, Kent MD, Queen
  Annes, and Talbot. In New Jersey...Atlantic, Atlantic Coastal Cape
  May, Camden, Cape May, Coastal Atlantic, Coastal Ocean,
  Cumberland, Eastern Monmouth, Gloucester, Hunterdon, Mercer,
  Middlesex, Morris, Northwestern Burlington, Ocean, Salem,
  Somerset, Southeastern Burlington, and Western Monmouth. In
  southeast Pennsylvania...Delaware, Eastern Chester, Eastern
  Montgomery, Lower Bucks, Philadelphia, Upper Bucks, Western
  Chester, and Western Montgomery.

* From Thursday afternoon through Friday morning.

* Tropical Storm Elsa will move across portions of DelMarVa, New
  Jersey, and eastern PA Thursday night, bringing heavy rainfall to
  the region. Expected rainfall totals across DelMarVa and New
  Jersey range from 2 to 3 inches, with locally higher amounts up to
  5 inches possible. Further west of the I-95 corridor could expect
  to see 1-2 inches, with locally higher amounts to 3 inches
  possible.

* Heavy rain in short periods of time will cause the potential for
  streams and creeks to quickly rise out of their banks as well as
  the potential for flash flooding in urban areas.

$$

Deal

=== PDS watches ===
If a flash flood watch is likely to lead to a major flash flood disaster, then enhanced wording with the words This is a particularly dangerous situation (PDS) can be added to the watch; this is occasionally issued. Below is an example issued by the National Weather Service in Memphis, Tennessee.

URGENT - IMMEDIATE BROADCAST REQUESTED
 FLOOD WATCH
 NATIONAL WEATHER SERVICE MEMPHIS TN
 239 PM CDT SUN APR 24 2011
 
 ...VERY HEAVY RAINFALL THROUGH THE MIDDLE OF THIS WEEK WILL LIKELY
 LEAD TO SIGNIFICANT...WIDESPREAD FLASH FLOODING...
 
 ...THIS IS A PARTICULARLY DANGEROUS SITUATION...
 
 A BOUNDARY WILL CONTINUE TO REMAIN STATIONARY ACROSS SOUTHERN
 MISSOURI INTO KENTUCKY THROUGH MONDAY. REPEATED ROUNDS OF
 THUNDERSTORMS WILL TRACK ALONG THE FRONT BRINGING HEAVY RAINFALL.
 THEN A LOW PRESSURE SYSTEM WILL TRACK ALONG IT INTO MISSOURI AND
 PUSH THE FRONT FURTHER SOUTH TO ALONG THE I-40 CORRIDOR MONDAY
 NIGHT THROUGH TUESDAY NIGHT. THIS WILL SHIFT THE HEAVY RAIN AXIS
 FURTHER SOUTH TO ALONG AND JUST NORTH OF THE I-40 CORRIDOR.
 
 A SECOND LOW PRESSURE SYSTEM WILL TRACK ALONG THE NEWLY STALLED
 BOUNDARY AND SET OFF ADDITIONAL TRAINING THUNDERSTORMS LATE
 TUESDAY NIGHT AND WEDNESDAY. THE FINAL COLD FRONT WILL PASS
 THROUGH LATE WEDNESDAY AFTERNOON...ENDING THE PERSISTENT HEAVY
 RAINFALL.
 
 ARZ026>028-035-036-048-049-058-MSZ001>014-TNZ003-004-019>021-
 048>055-088>092-250400-
 /O.NEW.KMEG.FF.A.0007.110426T0000Z-110428T0000Z/
 /00000.0.ER.000000T0000Z.000000T0000Z.000000T0000Z.OO/
 CRAIGHEAD-POINSETT-MISSISSIPPI-CROSS- 
 CRITTENDEN-ST. FRANCIS-
 LEE AR-PHILLIPS-DESOTO-MARSHALL-BENTON MS-TIPPAH-ALCORN-
 TISHOMINGO-TUNICA-TATE-PRENTISS- 
 COAHOMA-QUITMAN-PANOLA-LAFAYETTE- 
 
 UNION-WEAKLEY-HENRY-DYER-GIBSON-CARROLL-LAUDERDALE-TIPTON-HAYWOOD-
 CROCKETT-MADISON-CHESTER-HENDERSON- 
 DECATUR-SHELBY-FAYETTE-
 HARDEMAN-MCNAIRY-HARDIN-
 INCLUDING THE CITIES OF...JONESBORO...HARRISBURG...BLYTHEVILLE...
 WYNNE...WEST MEMPHIS...FORREST CITY...HELENA... 
 SOUTHAVEN...
 OLIVE BRANCH...CORINTH...IUKA...TUNICA...[[Booneville, 
 Mississippi|BOONEVILLE]]...
 CLARKSDALE...BATESVILLE...OXFORD...NEW ALBANY... 
 MARTIN...
 DRESDEN...PARIS...DYERSBURG...HUMBOLDT...MILAN...HUNTINGDON...
 COVINGTON...JACKSON...LEXINGTON...BARTLETT...GERMANTOWN...
 COLLIERVILLE...MEMPHIS...MILLINGTON...SOMERVILLE... 
 BOLIVAR...
 SAVANNAH
 239 PM CDT SUN APR 24 2011
 
 ...FLASH FLOOD WATCH IN EFFECT FROM MONDAY EVENING THROUGH
 WEDNESDAY EVENING...
 
 THE NATIONAL WEATHER SERVICE IN MEMPHIS HAS ISSUED A
 
 * FLASH FLOOD WATCH FOR PORTIONS OF EAST ARKANSAS...NORTH MISSISSIPPI
 AND WEST TENNESSEE...INCLUDING THE FOLLOWING AREAS...IN EAST
 ARKANSAS...CRAIGHEAD...CRITTENDEN...CROSS...
 LEE...MISSISSIPPI...PHILLIPS...POINSETT AND ST. FRANCIS. IN
 NORTH MISSISSIPPI...ALCORN...BENTON...COAHOMA...DESOTO...
 LAFAYETTE...MARSHALL...PANOLA...PRENTISS...QUITMAN...TATE...
 TIPPAH...TISHOMINGO...TUNICA AND UNION. IN WEST TENNESSEE...
 CARROLL...CHESTER...CROCKETT...DECATUR...DYER...FAYETTE...
 GIBSON...HARDEMAN...HARDIN...HAYWOOD...HENDERSON...HENRY...
 LAUDERDALE...MADISON...MCNAIRY...SHELBY...TIPTON AND WEAKLEY.
 
 * FROM MONDAY EVENING THROUGH WEDNESDAY EVENING.
 * THIS IS A PARTICULARLY DANGEROUS SITUATION
 * TOTAL RAINFALL AMOUNTS OF 5 TO 8 INCHES ARE EXPECTED ALONG AND
 NORTH OF I-40 WITH 2 TO 5 INCHES EXPECTED SOUTH OF I-40. LOCALLY
 HIGHER AMOUNTS ARE LIKELY.
 
 * RAINFALL AMOUNTS SUCH AS THESE MAY LEAD TO WIDESPREAD...
 SIGNIFICANT...AND LIFE THREATENING FLASH FLOODING. THIS EVENT
 MAY BE AS SEVERE AS THE MAY 1–2, 2010 FLOODING IN PLACES. FLASH
 FLOODING OF CITIES...RURAL AREAS...RIVERS...AND SMALL STREAMS
 ARE POSSIBLE.
 
 PRECAUTIONARY/PREPAREDNESS ACTIONS...
 
 A FLASH FLOOD WATCH MEANS THAT CONDITIONS MAY DEVELOP THAT LEAD
 TO FLASH FLOODING. FLASH FLOODING IS A VERY DANGEROUS SITUATION.
 
 YOU SHOULD MONITOR LATER FORECASTS AND BE PREPARED TO TAKE ACTION
 SHOULD FLASH FLOOD WARNINGS BE ISSUED.
 
 &&
 
 $$
 
 ARZ008-009-017-018-MOZ113-115-TNZ001-002-250400-
 /O.EXT.KMEG.FF.A.0006.000000T0000Z-110428T0000Z/
 /00000.0.ER.000000T0000Z.000000T0000Z.000000T0000Z.OO/
 RANDOLPH-CLAY-LAWRENCE-GREENE-DUNKLIN-PEMISCOT-LAKE-OBION-
 INCLUDING THE CITIES OF...WALNUT RIDGE...PARAGOULD...KENNETT...
 CARUTHERSVILLE...UNION CITY
 239 PM CDT SUN APR 24 2011
 
 ...FLASH FLOOD WATCH NOW IN EFFECT THROUGH WEDNESDAY EVENING...
 
 THE FLASH FLOOD WATCH IS NOW IN EFFECT FOR
 
 * PORTIONS OF EAST ARKANSAS...SOUTHEAST MISSOURI AND WEST
 TENNESSEE...INCLUDING THE FOLLOWING AREAS...IN EAST ARKANSAS...
 CLAY...GREENE...LAWRENCE AND RANDOLPH. IN SOUTHEAST MISSOURI...
 DUNKLIN AND PEMISCOT. IN WEST TENNESSEE...LAKE AND OBION.
 
 * THROUGH WEDNESDAY EVENING.
 * THIS IS A PARTICULARLY DANGEROUS SITUATION
 * ADDITIONAL RAINFALL AMOUNTS OF 6 TO 9 INCHES ARE EXPECTED.
 LOCALLY HIGHER AMOUNTS ARE LIKELY. THIS...IN COMBINATION OF
 THE 2 TO 4 INCHES THAT HAVE ALREADY FALLEN MAY LEAD TO TOTAL
 RAINFALL AMOUNTS IN EXCESS OF 12 INCHES IN MANY LOCATIONS.
 
 * RAINFALL AMOUNTS SUCH AS THESE WILL LIKELY LEAD TO WIDESPREAD...
 SIGNIFICANT...AND LIFE THREATENING FLASH FLOODING. THIS EVENT
 MAY BE AS SEVERE AS THE MAY 1-2 2010 FLOODING IN MANY PLACES.
 FLASH FLOODING OF CITIES...RURAL AREAS...RIVERS...AND SMALL
 STREAMS ARE POSSIBLE.
 
 PRECAUTIONARY/PREPAREDNESS ACTIONS...
 
 A FLASH FLOOD WATCH MEANS THAT CONDITIONS MAY DEVELOP THAT LEAD
 TO FLASH FLOODING. FLASH FLOODING IS A VERY DANGEROUS SITUATION.
 
 YOU SHOULD MONITOR LATER FORECASTS AND BE PREPARED TO TAKE ACTION
 SHOULD FLASH FLOOD WARNINGS BE ISSUED.
 
 &&
 
 $$
 
 BORGHOFF

== See also ==
- Tornado warning
- Tornado watch
- Severe thunderstorm warning
- Severe thunderstorm watch
- Flash flood warning
- Particularly dangerous situation
