= Flash flood warning =

Weather warning indicating observed or imminent flash flooding in the area

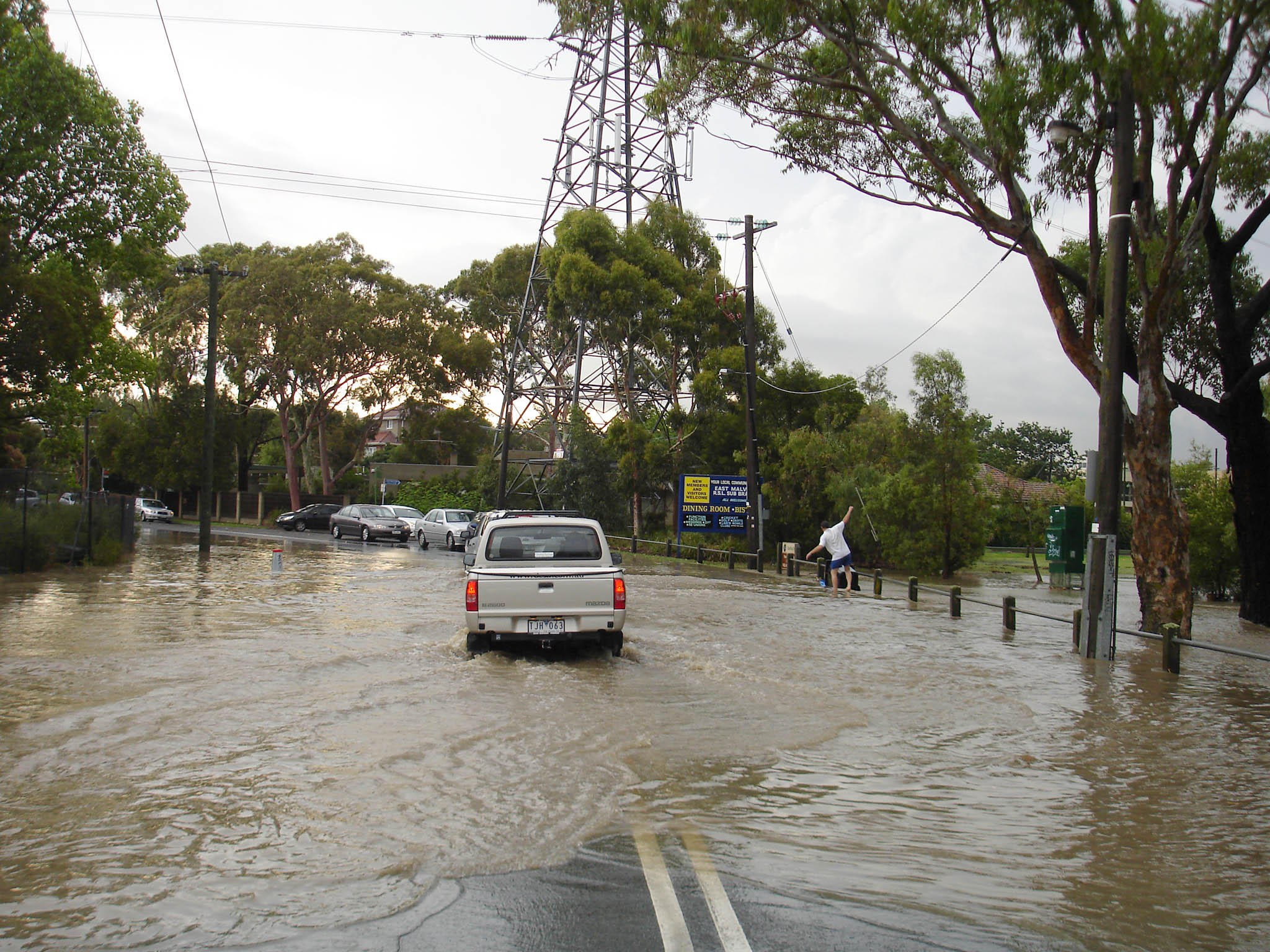
Flash flooding in Melbourne, Australia

A flash flood warning (SAME code: FFW) is a severe weather warning product of the National Weather Service that is issued by national weather forecasting agencies throughout the world to alert the public that a flash flood is imminent or occurring in the warned area. A flash flood is a sudden, violent flood after a heavy rain, or occasionally after a dam break. Rainfall intensity and duration, topography, soil conditions, and ground cover contribute to flash flooding.

Most flash floods occur when there is a heavy amount of precipitation falling in an area and that water is then channeled through streams or narrow gullies. Flash floods may take minutes or hours to develop. It is possible to experience a flash flood without witnessing any rain.

== Flash flood alerts ==
There are two types of alerts for flash floods which are issued by the National Weather Service. One is a flash flood watch, which means that conditions are favorable for flash flooding, and the other is a flash flood warning, meaning that a flash flood is occurring or one will occur imminently and is usually issued when there are strong weather radar echoes for an area that is prone to flash flooding. Flash floods can also occur because of a dam or levee failure, or because of a sudden release of water held by an ice jam.

Residents are usually urged to do the following when flash flooding is imminent:

- Be aware of any signs of heavy rain
- Move to higher ground if rapidly rising water is seen or heard
- Not attempt to cross the flowing water

=== Flash flood emergency ===
In addition, there is an enhanced version of flash flood warning, referred to as a flash flood emergency (or as termed by the Albany, New York office as a flash flood warning emergency), which indicates a severe flooding situation, often, but not always in densely populated areas, similar to the procedure for declaring a tornado emergency.

According to the National Weather Service, examples of situations that warrant the inclusion of flash flood emergency language in flash flood warnings may include, but are not necessarily limited to:

- Emergency manager(s) of the affected county(ies) or the state emergency management association declare a state of emergency and have confirmed that rapidly rising floodwaters are placing or will place people in life-threatening situations. The state of emergency for the affected areas may have been previously relayed by the emergency manager(s) or the state emergency management association through the local NWS forecast office in a Non-Weather emergency message. These might include a civil emergency message (CEM), an evacuation immediate (EVI), or a local area emergency (LAE).
- Water has rapidly risen or will rapidly rise to levels where people who are ordinarily in safe locations during previous flash flood events are now placed in life-threatening situations. For example, people in homes that might see waters rapidly rise up to their front yards or steps during typical flash flood situations would experience waters that are several feet above floor level, such that rescue is necessary and/or their entire home is threatened.
- Multiple swift water rescue teams have been or are being deployed in response to flash flooding of an exceptional magnitude.
- Stream gages, where available, indicate floodwaters have risen rapidly to at least major levels, or if gages are not available, floodwaters have risen to levels rarely, if ever, seen.
- Total failure of a major high hazard dam that would have a catastrophic impact on the downstream communities.

The National Weather Service also notes that in situations where a robust emergency management structure does not exist or external communications are not possible, a local forecast office may include flash flood emergency language in a flash flood warning without pre-coordinating with emergency managers when the above or similar criteria are met.

=== Notable events where flash flood emergencies were issued ===
On August 27, 2017, as Hurricane Harvey brought torrential rain to southeast Texas, the NWS issued a "Flash Flood Emergency for Catastrophic Life Threatening Flooding."

On September 10, 2017, the NWS issued a Flash Flood Emergency for life-threatening storm surge because of Hurricane Irma in southwestern Florida at the eye landfall.

On February 6, 2020, the NWS issued a Flash Flood Emergency for Tazewell County, Virginia due to a major storm moving through the area which caused the Clinch River to rise to its highest crest in 40 years.

On May 20, 2020, the NWS issued a Flash Flood Emergency for the Tittabawassee River in Midland County, Michigan due to multiple dam failures causing the river to overflow and reach its highest crest since 1986.

On July 6, 2020, the NWS issued a Flash Flood Emergency for Tacony Creek and Frankford Creek, the former situated along Montgomery County and North Philadelphia, Pennsylvania, and the latter along Philadelphia's Frankford neighborhood.

On September 1, 2021, the NWS issued a first ever Flash Flood Emergency for New York City, Philadelphia, Fairfield and New Haven Counties in Connecticut, and most of Central New Jersey a region that stretches over 200 miles, as the remnants of Hurricane Ida transitioned and intensified into a post-tropical cyclone causing torrential rains. Some areas reported up to 10 inches of rain in less than an hour. Although the region was forecasted to experience heavy rains, this event is considered unprecedented as such a warning has never been issued to the area. The region had already experienced above average precipitation for most of the Summer due to previous storm systems and tropical storms affecting the area.

On July 28, 2022, the NWS issued several Flash Flood Emergencies in eastern Kentucky for catastrophic and deadly flooding.

On March 27, 2023, the NWS issued a Flash Flood Emergency for a dam break on the Head's Creek Reservoir in Spaulding County, Georgia. A statement was later posted on Twitter.

On September 27, 2024, a Flash Flood Emergency was issued for Metro Atlanta as Hurricane Helene brought catastrophic flooding to the area.

On October 9, 2024, a Flash Flood Emergency was issued for several counties in the Tampa Bay and Big Bend areas of Florida as Hurricane Milton posed life-threatening flooding to a large portion of the West Coast.

From July 4-7, 2025, several Flash Flood Emergencies were issued in central Texas, as a slow-moving mesoscale convective complex caused catastrophic flooding, particularly in Kerr County. At least 135 people have been confirmed dead from this event as of August 8, 2025.

A flash flood warning issued for North Carolina using the current voice, Paul
An example of a flash flood warning using the current Broadcast Message Handler (BMH) Paul Voice, this one being issued in North Carolina on 9 September 2023 at 1:27 PM EDT.

Flash flood warning issued for Tennessee using the former voice, Tom
An example of a flash flood warning using the old Console Replacement System (CRS) Tom Voice, this one being issued in Tennessee.

== See also ==
- Flash flood guidance system
- Severe weather terminology (United States)
