= Slug test =

Type of aquifer test

In hydrogeology, a slug test is a particular type of aquifer test where water is quickly added or removed from a groundwater well, and the change in hydraulic head is monitored through time, to determine the near-well aquifer characteristics. It is a method used by hydrogeologists and civil engineers to determine the transmissivity, hydraulic conductivity, and storativity of the material the well is completed in.

== Method ==
The "slug" of water can either be added to or removed from the well — the only requirement is that it be done as quickly as possible (the interpretation typically assumes instantaneously), then the water level or pressure is monitored. Depending on the properties of the aquifer and the size of the slug, the water level may return to pre-test levels very quickly (thus complicating accurate collection of water level data).

A slug can be added by either quickly adding a measured amount of water to the well or something which displaces a measured volume (e.g., a long heavy pipe with the ends capped off). An alternative object is a solid polyvinyl chloride (PVC) rod, with sufficient weight to sink into the groundwater. The objective here is to displace water, not merely be "heavy". A slug of water can be removed using a bailer or pump, but this is more difficult to do since it must be done very quickly and the equipment for removing the water (pump or bailer) will likely be in the way of getting water level measurements.

== Performance ==
A slug test is in contrast to standard aquifer tests, which typically involve pumping a well at a constant flowrate, and monitoring the response of the aquifer in nearby monitoring wells. Often slug tests are performed instead of a constant rate test, because:

- time constraints (quick results, or results for a large number of wells, are needed),
- the well does not or cannot have a pump installed on it (slug tests do not require pumping),
- the transmissivity of the material the well is cased in is too low to realistically perform a proper pumping test (common for aquitards or some bedrock monitoring wells), or
- the general size (order of magnitude) of the aquifer parameters is all the accuracy that is required.

The size of the slug required is determined by the aquifer properties, the size of the well and the amount of time which is available for the test. For very permeable aquifers, the pulse will dissipate very quickly. If the well has a large diameter, a large volume of water must be added to increase the level in the well a measurable amount.

== Interpretation ==
Because the flow rate into or out of the well is not constant, as is the case in a typical aquifer test, the standard Theis solution does not work.

Mathematically, the Theis equation is the solution of the groundwater flow equation for a step increase in discharge rate at the pumping well; a slug test is instead an instantaneous pulse at the pumping well. This means that a superposition (or more precisely a convolution) of an infinite number of sequential slug tests through time would effectively be a "standard" Theis aquifer test.

There are several known solutions to the slug test problem; a common engineering approximation is the Hvorslev method, which approximates the more rigorous solution to transient aquifer flow with a simple decaying exponential function.

The aquifer parameters obtained from a slug test are typically less representative of the aquifer surrounding the well than an aquifer test which involves pumping in one well and monitoring in another. Complications arise from near-well effects (i.e., well skin and wellbore storage), which may make it difficult to get accurate results from slug test interpretation.

== See also ==
- Aquifer test
- Well test
