= Specific quantity =

Quotient of a quantity by mass

In the natural sciences, including physiology and engineering, the qualifier specific or massic typically indicates an intensive quantity obtained by dividing an extensive quantity of interest by mass. For example, specific leaf area is leaf area divided by leaf mass. Derived SI units involve reciprocal kilogram (kg^{−1}), e.g., square metre per kilogram (m^{2}⋅kg^{−1}); the expression "per unit mass" is also often used.

In some fields, like acoustics, "specific" can mean division by a quantity other than mass.

Named and unnamed specific quantities are given for the terms below.

== List ==
=== Mass-specific quantities ===
Per unit of mass (short form of mass-specific):

- Specific absorption rate, power absorbed per unit mass of tissue at a given frequency
- Specific activity, radioactivity in becquerels per unit mass
- Specific energy, defined as energy per unit mass
  - Specific internal energy, internal energy per unit mass
  - Specific kinetic energy, kinetic energy of an object per unit of mass
- Specific enthalpy, enthalpy per unit mass
- Specific enzyme activity, activity per milligram of total protein
- Specific force, defined as the non-gravitational force per unit mass
- Specific heat capacity, heat capacity per unit mass, unless another unit is named, such as mole-specific heat capacity, or volume-specific heat capacity
- Specific latent heat, latent heat per unit mass
- Specific leaf area, leaf area per unit dry leaf mass
- Specific modulus, a materials property consisting of the elastic modulus per mass density of a material
- Specific orbital energy, orbital energy per unit mass
- Specific power, per unit of mass (or volume or area)
- Specific relative angular momentum, of two orbiting bodies is angular momentum divided by the reduced mass, or the cross product of the relative position and the relative velocity
- Specific surface area, per unit of mass, volume, or cross-sectional area
- Specific volume, volume per unit mass, i.e. the reciprocal of density
- Mass ratio, "ratio by mass", mass per unit mass, massic mass or specific mass: the ratio of two mass values (in kilogram per kilogram)

=== Examples of other uses ===
Per unit of other types.

- Brake-specific fuel consumption, fuel consumption per unit of braking power
- Thrust-specific fuel consumption, fuel consumption per unit of thrust
- Specific acid catalysis, in which the reaction rate is proportional to the concentration of the protonated solvent molecules
- Specific acoustic impedance, ratio of sound pressure to particle speed at a single frequency
- Specific capacity of a water well, quantity of water produced per (length) unit of drawdown
- Specific detectivity of a photodetector
- Specific gas constant, per molar mass
- Specific gravity, also called relative density, is a dimensionless quantity defined as the ratio of the density (mass divided by volume) of a substance to the density of a given reference material
- Specific humidity, mass of water vapour per unit mass dry air
- Specific impulse, impulse (momentum change) per unit mass of propellant
- Specific modulus, elastic modulus per mass density
- Specific speed, unitless figure of merit used to classify pump impellers (pump-specific) and turbines (turbine-specific). Ratio of performance against reference pump that needs one unit of speed to pump one unit volume per one unit hydraulic head pressure. For a turbine, it is performance measured against a reference turbine that develops one unit of power per one unit speed per one unit of hydraulic head.
- Specific storage, specific yield, and specific capacity, quantify the capacity of an aquifer to release groundwater from storage per unit decline in hydraulic head pressure
- Specific strength, material strength (pressure required at failure) per unit material density
- Specific surface area, per unit of mass, volume, or cross-sectional area
- Specific thrust, thrust per unit mass of air intake rate

== See also ==
- Intensive and extensive properties § Specific properties
- Areic quantity
- Lineic quantity
- Molar quantity
- Volumic quantity
