= Northern Rocky Mountain Intermontane Basins Aquifer System =

Aquifer system

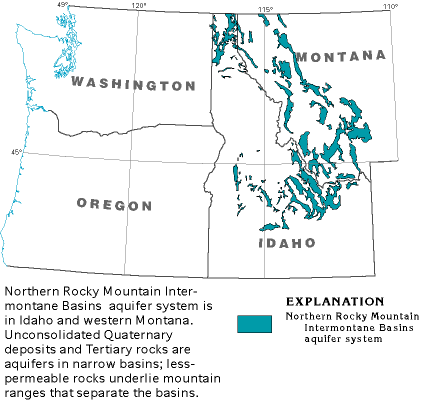
Map of aquifers within this classification

The Northern Rocky Mountain Intermontane Basins aquifer system is composed largely of unconsolidated sand lying under western Montana, Idaho and a small part of Washington. These shallow aquifers are not connected as a whole, body of water, but narrow glacial deposits unified by a common geologic history.

== Geological significance ==
The basins are filled with unconsolidated to poorly consolidated Tertiary and Quaternary deposits as much as 16,000 feet thick and are separated by Archean to Quaternary bedrock. Unconsolidated and semi-consolidated sand and gravel aquifers have a high conductivity and are largely shallow, small and unmapped. There are four types of these unconsolidated aquifers, "valley-fill aquifers"; blanket sand and gravel aquifers; glacial-deposit aquifers; and stream-valley aquifers. There are 70 intermontane watersheds in this area of 80,000 square miles. The alluvial and glacial deposits found in this region are generally known for being productive, shallow aquifers.

== Human significance ==
These aquifers are close to the surface, and have a high hydraulic conductivity, so they are at a high risk for pollution. Known pollutants in this area are arsenic, cadmium, copper, lead, and zinc due to mining activities coupled with elevated levels of phosphorus and nitrogen due to agriculture activities. Water withdrawals from the aquifer region are derived 80% from surface water, 20% groundwater; however 60% of domestic, commercial and municipal water supply comes from groundwater. Wells range from 50 to 1,125 feet deep. This region of the United States is not heavily populated, but more than half the population relies on these aquifers for drinking water, and the aquifers are highly susceptible for pollution.
