= Compensatory conductance =

The compensatory root water uptake conductance (Kcomp) ($L^3 P^{-1} T^{-1}$) characterizes how a plant compensates its water uptake under heterogeneous water potential. It controls the root water uptake in a soil where the water potential is not uniform.

== See also ==
- Standard Uptake Fraction
- Hydraulic conductivity
