= Pendular water =

Pendular water is the moisture clinging to particles, such as soil particles or sand, because of surface tension.

At the moisture content of a specific yield, gravity drainage will cease. This term relates to hydrology and groundwater flow.
