= Dupuit–Forchheimer assumption =

The Dupuit–Forchheimer assumption holds that groundwater flows horizontally in an unconfined aquifer and that the groundwater discharge is proportional to the saturated aquifer thickness. It was formulated by Jules Dupuit and Philipp Forchheimer in the late 1800s to simplify groundwater flow equations for analytical solutions.

The Dupuit–Forchheimer assumption requires that the water table be relatively flat and that the groundwater be hydrostatic (that is, that the equipotential lines are vertical):

$$\begin{align}
\frac{\partial P}{\partial z} &= -\gamma = -\rho \, g \\[0.5em]
\frac{\partial h}{\partial z} &= 0
\end{align}$$

where $\partial P/\partial z$ is the vertical pressure gradient, $\gamma$ is the specific weight, $\rho$ is the density of water, $g$ is the standard gravity, and $\partial h/\partial z$ is the vertical hydraulic gradient.
