= Standard Uptake Fraction =

The Standard Uptake Fraction (SUF) is the relative distribution of water uptake of a plant in a soil with a uniform water potential. The SUF gives the ratio coefficient to obtain the equivalent soil water potential sensed by the plant. It is one of the macroscopic parameter for the hydraulic properties of the root system.

$SUF = \dfrac{J_r}{T_{act}}$

$J_r$ = the radial flow entering each root segment ($L^{3}T^{-1}$), and $T_{act}$ = the actual transpiration ($L^{3}T^{-1}$).

In order to get this parameter, the easiest way is to deal with Functional-Structural Plant Models. They will compute the radial water flow for each root segment and then divide the total by the actual transpiration. MARSHAL is a set of online tools developed to visualise the root system and allows to look after the SUF.

== Standard Uptake Density ==
The standard uptake density (SUD) ($L^{-1}$) is the distribution of the water uptake flow rate in the soil where the water potential is uniform. In other words:

$SUD = \dfrac{SUF}{L_{segment}}$

$L_{segment}$ = the segment length ($L$).

== Standard Sink Fraction ==
The standard sink fraction (SSF) is very similar to the SUF, but instead of being a function of the root segment, it is related to the soil voxel. It is the normalised distribution of the sink term in a uniform water potential soil.

== See also ==
- Absorption of water
- Root system equivalent conductance
- Compensatory conductance
