= Specific force =

Concept in physics

Specific force (SF) is a mass-specific quantity defined as the quotient of force per unit mass.

$$\mathrm{SF} = F / m$$

It is a physical quantity of kind acceleration, with dimension of length per time squared (T^{-2}L) and SI units of metre per second squared (m·s^{−2}).

It is normally applied to forces other than gravity, to emulate the relationship between gravitational acceleration and gravitational force. It can also be called mass-specific weight (weight per unit mass), as the weight of an object is equal to the magnitude of the gravity force acting on it.

The g-force is an instance of specific force measured in units of the standard gravity (g) instead of m/s², i.e., in multiples of g (e.g., "3 g").

== Type of acceleration ==
The (mass-)specific force is not a coordinate acceleration, but rather a proper acceleration, which is the acceleration relative to free-fall. Forces, specific forces, and proper accelerations are the same in all reference frames, but coordinate accelerations are frame-dependent. For free bodies, the specific force is the cause of, and a measure of, the body's proper acceleration.

The acceleration of an object free falling towards the Earth depends on the reference frame (it disappears in the free-fall frame, also called the inertial frame), but any g-force "acceleration" will be present in all frames. This specific force is zero for freely-falling objects, since gravity acting alone does not produce g-forces or specific forces.

Accelerometers on the surface of the Earth measure a constant 9.8 m/s^2 even when they are not accelerating (that is, when they do not undergo coordinate acceleration). This is because accelerometers measure the proper acceleration produced by the g-force exerted by the ground (gravity acting alone never produces g-force or specific force). Accelerometers measure specific force (proper acceleration), which is the acceleration relative to free-fall, not the "standard" acceleration that is relative to a coordinate system.

== Hydraulics ==
In open channel hydraulics, specific force ($F_s$) has a different meaning:

$$F_s = \frac{Q^2}{gA} + zA$$

where Q is the discharge, g is the acceleration due to gravity, A is the cross-sectional area of flow, and z is the depth of the centroid of flow area A.

== See also ==
- Acceleration
- Proper acceleration
