= Groundwater discharge =

Volumetric flow rate of groundwater through an aquifer

Groundwater discharge is the volumetric flow rate of groundwater through an aquifer.

Total groundwater discharge, as reported through a specified area, is similarly expressed as:

$$Q = \frac{dh}{dl}KA$$

where

Q is the total groundwater discharge ([L^{3}·T^{−1}]; m^{3}/s),
K is the hydraulic conductivity of the aquifer ([L·T^{−1}]; m/s),
dh/dl is the hydraulic gradient ([L·L^{−1}]; unitless), and
A is the area which the groundwater is flowing through ([L^{2}]; m^{2})

For example, this can be used to determine the flow rate of water flowing along a plane with known geometry.

== The discharge potential ==
The discharge potential is a potential in groundwater mechanics which links the physical properties, hydraulic head, with a mathematical formulation for the energy as a function of position. The discharge potential, $\Phi$ [L^{3}·T^{−1}], is defined in such way that its gradient equals the discharge vector.

$Q_x = -\frac{\partial \Phi}{\partial x}$

$Q_y = -\frac{\partial \Phi}{\partial y}$

Thus the hydraulic head may be calculated in terms of the discharge potential, for confined flow as

$\Phi = KH\phi$

and for unconfined shallow flow as

$\Phi = \frac{1}{2}K\phi^2+C$

where

$H$ is the thickness of the aquifer [L],
$\phi$ is the hydraulic head [L], and
$C$ is an arbitrary constant [L^{3}·T^{−1}] given by the boundary conditions.

As mentioned the discharge potential may also be written in terms of position. The discharge potential is a function of the Laplace's equation

$\frac{\partial^2 \Phi}{\partial x^2} + \frac{\partial^2 \Phi}{\partial y^2} = 0$

which solution is a linear differential equation. Because the solution is a linear differential equation for which superposition principle holds, it may be combined with other solutions for the discharge potential, such as uniform flow, multiple wells, analytical elements (analytic element method).

== See also ==
- Groundwater flow equation
- Groundwater energy balance
- Submarine groundwater discharge
- Discharge (hydrology)
- Flux (transport definition)
- Darcy's law
