= Drawdown (hydrology) =

Reduction in water level over time within a water well

In hydrology, there are two similar but distinct definitions in use for the word drawdown:

- In subsurface hydrogeology, drawdown is the reduction in hydraulic head observed at a well in an aquifer, typically due to pumping a well as part of an aquifer test or well test.
- In surface water hydrology and civil engineering, drawdown refers to the lowering of the surface elevation of a body of water, the water table, the piezometric surface, or the water surface of a well, as a result of the withdrawal of water.

In either case, drawdown is the change in hydraulic head or water level relative to the initial spatial and temporal conditions of the system. Drawdown is often represented in cross-sectional diagrams of aquifers. A record of hydraulic head, or rate of flow (discharge), versus time is more generally called a hydrograph (in both groundwater and surface water). The main contributor to groundwater drawdown since the 1960s is over-exploitation of groundwater resources.

Drawdown occurs in response to:

1. pumping from the bore
2. interference from a neighbouring pumping bore
3. in response to local, intensive groundwater pumping
4. regional seasonal decline due to discharge in excess of recharge

== Terminology ==
- Aquifer is an underground layer of permeable rock or sand, that hold or transmit groundwater below the water table that yield a significant supply of water to a well.
- Aquifer test (or a pumping test) is a field experiment in which a well is pumped at a controlled rate and the aquifer's response (drawdown) is measured in one or more observation wells.
- Cone of depression is a conically shaped depression that is produced in a water table as a result of pumping water from a well at a given rate.
- Groundwater is water located beneath the earth's surface in pores and fractures of soil and rocks.
- Hydraulic head (or piezometric head) is a specific measurement of the potential of water above a vertical datum. It is the height of the free surface of water above a given point beneath the surface.
- Pumping level is the level of water in the well during pumping.
- Specific capacity is the well yield per unit of drawdown.
- Static level is the level of water in the well when no water is being removed from the well by pumping.
- Water table is the upper level of the zone of saturation, an underground surface in which the soil or rock is permanently saturated with water.
- Well yield is the volume of water per unit time that is produced by the well from pumping.

== Methods for measuring drawdown ==
- Transducers are used to measure water levels in groundwater wells, rivers, streams, tanks, open channels and lift stations.
- Acoustic well sounders or echometers are a simple, cost effective, and minimally intrusive tool used to measure subsurface pressures and levels.
- Electric sounders are a practical land cost-effective method used to measure well water levels. This method uses a weight attached to a stranded insulated wire and an ammeter to indicate a closed circuit. Current supplied from a small battery flows through the circuit when the tip of the wire is in contact with the surface of the water.
- Air line method is a convenient and nonintrusive method used to measure water levels that is often used for the repeated testing of wells over 300 feet deep. This method obtains water table depth using a pressure gauge and water displacement.
- Wetted tape method is a commonly used method for measuring water levels up to roughly 90 feet deep. This method uses a lead weight attached to a steel measuring tape.

== Ecological impacts of groundwater drawdown ==
Groundwater drawdown due to excessive water extraction can have adverse ecological impacts. Groundwater environments often have high biodiversity, however, drawdown alters the amount and types of nutrients released to surrounding organisms. In addition, nearby wetlands, fisheries, terrestrial and aquatic habitats may be altered with a reduction in the water available to these ecosystems, sometimes altering species ecophysiology.

Extracting groundwater at a rate that is faster than it can be naturally replenished is often referred to as overdrafting. Overdrafting may decrease the amount of groundwater that naturally feeds surrounding water bodies, including wetlands, lakes, rivers and streams. Additionally, when a cone of depression is formed around a pumping well due to groundwater extraction, nearby groundwater sources may flow toward the well to replenish the cone, taking water from local streams and lakes. This may result in poor water quality in these local water bodies as baseflow water contribution is reduced, which could result in perennial streams becoming more intermittent, and intermittent streams becoming more ephemeral. Finally, drawdown from groundwater extraction may lead to an increased sensitivity of the ecosystem to climate change and may be a contributing factor to sea-level rise and land subsidence.

== Related ==
- Subsidence
