= Flow net =

Type of graph

A flow net is a graphical representation of two-dimensional steady-state groundwater flow through aquifers.

Construction of a flow net is often used for solving groundwater flow problems where the geometry makes analytical solutions impractical. The method is often used in civil engineering, hydrogeology or soil mechanics as a first check for problems of flow under hydraulic structures like dams or sheet pile walls. As such, a grid obtained by drawing a series of equipotential lines is called a flow net. The flow net is an important tool in analysing two-dimensional irrotational flow problems. Flow net technique is a graphical representation method.

== Basic method ==
The method consists of filling the flow area with stream and equipotential lines, which are everywhere perpendicular to each other, making a curvilinear grid. Typically there are two surfaces (boundaries) which are at constant values of potential or hydraulic head (upstream and downstream ends), and the other surfaces are no-flow boundaries (i.e., impermeable; for example the bottom of the dam and the top of an impermeable bedrock layer), which define the sides of the outermost streamtubes (see figure 1 for a stereotypical flow net example).

Mathematically, the process of constructing a flow net consists of contouring the two harmonic or analytic functions of potential and stream function. These functions both satisfy the Laplace equation and the contour lines represent lines of constant head (equipotentials) and lines tangent to flowpaths (streamlines). Together, the potential function and the stream function form the complex potential, where the potential is the real part, and the stream function is the imaginary part.

The construction of a flow net provides an approximate solution to the flow problem, but it can be quite good even for problems with complex geometries by following a few simple rules (initially developed by Philipp Forchheimer around 1900, and later formalized by Arthur Casagrande in 1937) and a little practice:

- streamlines and equipotentials meet at right angles (including the boundaries),
- diagonals drawn between the cornerpoints of a flow net will meet each other at right angles (useful when near singularities),
- streamtubes and drops in equipotential can be halved and should still make squares (useful when squares get very large at the ends),
- flow nets often have areas which consist of nearly parallel lines, which produce true squares; start in these areas — working towards areas with complex geometry,
- many problems have some symmetry (e.g., radial flow to a well); only a section of the flow net needs to be constructed,
- the sizes of the squares should change gradually; transitions are smooth and the curved paths should be roughly elliptical or parabolic in shape.

== Example flow nets ==
The first flow net pictured here (modified from Craig, 1997) illustrates and quantifies the flow which occurs under the dam (flow is assumed to be invariant along the axis of the dam — valid near the middle of the dam); from the pool behind the dam (on the right) to the tailwater downstream from the dam (on the left).

There are 16 green equipotential lines (15 equal drops in hydraulic head) between the 5 m upstream head to the 1m downstream head (4 m / 15 head drops = 0.267 m head drop between each green line). The blue streamlines (equal changes in the streamfunction between the two no-flow boundaries) show the flowpath taken by water as it moves through the system; the streamlines are everywhere tangent to the flow velocity.

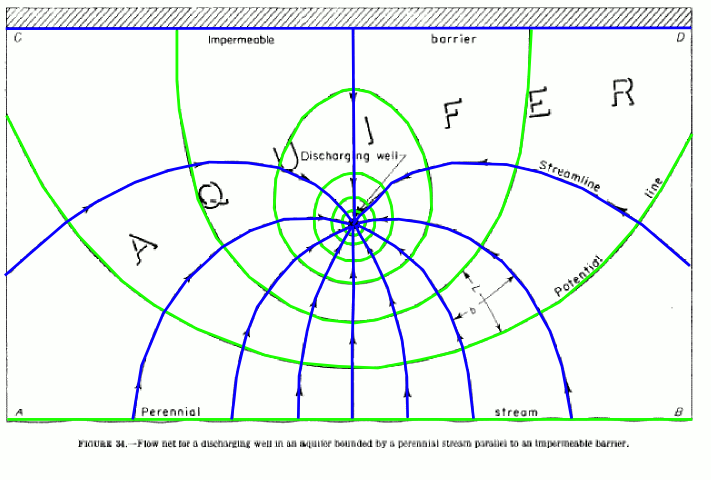
Example flow net 2, click to view full-size.

The second flow net pictured here (modified from Ferris, et al., 1962) shows a flow net being used to analyze map-view flow (invariant in the vertical direction), rather than a cross-section. Note that this problem has symmetry, and only the left or right portions of it needed to have been done. To create a flow net to a point sink (a singularity), there must be a recharge boundary nearby to provide water and allow a steady-state flowfield to develop.

== Flow net results ==
Darcy's law describes the flow of water through the flow net. Since the head drops are uniform by construction, the gradient is inversely proportional to the size of the blocks. Big blocks mean there is a low gradient, and therefore low discharge (hydraulic conductivity is assumed constant here).

An equivalent amount of flow is passing through each streamtube (defined by two adjacent blue lines in diagram), therefore narrow streamtubes are located where there is more flow. The smallest squares in a flow net are located at points where the flow is concentrated (in this diagram they are near the tip of the cutoff wall, used to reduce dam underflow), and high flow at the land surface is often what the civil engineer is trying to avoid, being concerned about piping or dam failure.

== Singularities ==
Irregular points (also called singularities) in the flow field occur when streamlines have kinks in them (the derivative doesn't exist at a point). This can happen where the bend is outward (e.g., the bottom of the cutoff wall in the figure above), and there is infinite flux at a point, or where the bend is inward (e.g., the corner just above and to the left of the cutoff wall in the figure above) where the flux is zero.

The second flow net illustrates a well, which is typically represented mathematically as a point source (the well shrinks to zero radius); this is a singularity because the flow is converging to a point, at that point the Laplace equation is not satisfied.

These points are mathematical artifacts of the equation used to solve the real-world problem, and do not actually mean that there is infinite or no flux at points in the subsurface. These types of points often do make other types of solutions (especially numeric) to these problems difficult, while the simple graphical technique handles them nicely.

== Extensions to standard flow nets ==
Typically flow nets are constructed for homogeneous, isotropic porous media experiencing saturated flow to known boundaries. There are extensions to the basic method to allow some of these other cases to be solved:

- inhomogeneous aquifer: matching conditions at boundaries between properties
- anisotropic aquifer: drawing the flownet in a transformed domain, then scaling the results differently in the principle hydraulic conductivity directions, to return the solution
- one boundary is a seepage face: iteratively solving for both the boundary condition and the solution throughout the domain

Although the method is commonly used for these types of groundwater flow problems, it can be used for any problem which is described by the Laplace equation ($\nabla^2 \phi = 0$), for example electric current flow through the earth.

== See also ==
- Potential flow (the flow net is a method for solving potential flow problems)
- Analytic function (the potential and streamfunction plotted in flow nets are examples of analytic functions)
