= Well test =

Evaluation of how much water can be pumped from a water well

In hydrology, a well test is conducted to evaluate the amount of water that can be pumped from a particular water well. More specifically, a well test will allow prediction of the maximum rate at which water can be pumped from a well, and the distance that the water level in the well will fall for a given pumping rate and duration of pumping.

Well testing differs from aquifer testing in that the behaviour of the well is primarily of concern in the former, while the characteristics of the aquifer (the geological formation or unit that supplies water to the well) are quantified in the latter.

When water is pumped from a well the water level in the well falls. This fall is called drawdown. The amount of water that can be pumped is limited by the drawdown produced. Typically, drawdown also increases with the length of time that the pumping continues.

== Well losses vs. aquifer losses ==
The components of observed drawdown in a pumping well were first described by Jacob (1947), and the test was refined independently by Hantush (1964) and Bierschenk (1963) as consisting of two related components,

$$s = BQ + CQ^2$$,

where s is drawdown (units of length e.g., m), $Q$ is the pumping rate (units of volume flowrate e.g., m³/day), $B$ is the aquifer loss coefficient (which increases with time — as predicted by the Theis solution) and $C$ is the well loss coefficient (which is constant for a given flow rate).

The first term of the equation ($BQ$) describes the linear component of the drawdown; i.e., the part in which doubling the pumping rate doubles the drawdown.

The second term ($CQ^2$) describes what is often called the 'well losses'; the non-linear component of the drawdown. To quantify this it is necessary to pump the well at several different flow rates (commonly called steps). Rorabaugh (1953) added to this analysis by making the exponent an arbitrary power (usually between 1.5 and 3.5).

To analyze this equation, both sides are divided by the discharge rate ($Q$), leaving $s/Q$ on the left side, which is commonly referred to as specific drawdown. The right hand side of the equation becomes that of a straight line. Plotting the specific drawdown after a set amount of time ($\Delta t$) since the beginning of each step of the test (since drawdown will continue to increase with time) versus pumping rate should produce a straight line.

$$\frac{s}{Q} = B + CQ$$

Fitting a straight line through the observed data, the slope of the best fit line will be $C$ (well losses) and the intercept of this line with $Q=0$ will be $B$ (aquifer losses). This process is fitting an idealized model to real world data, and seeing what parameters in the model make it fit reality best. The assumption is then made that these fitted parameters best represent reality (given the assumptions that went into the model are true).

The relationship above is for fully penetrating wells in confined aquifers (the same assumptions used in the Theis solution for determining aquifer characteristics in an aquifer test).

== Well efficiency ==
Often the well efficiency is determined from this sort of test, this is a percentage indicating the fraction of total observed drawdown in a pumping well which is due to aquifer losses (as opposed to being due to flow through the well screen and inside the borehole). A perfectly efficient well, with perfect well screen and where the water flows inside the well in a frictionless manner would have 100% efficiency. Unfortunately well efficiency is hard to compare between wells because it depends on the characteristics of the aquifer too (the same amount of well losses compared to a more transmissive aquifer would give a lower efficiency).

== Specific capacity ==
Specific capacity is a quantity which a water well can produce per unit of drawdown. It is normally obtained from a step drawdown test. Specific capacity is expressed as:

$$S_c=\frac{Q}{h_0 - h}$$

where

$S_c$ is the specific capacity ([L^{2}T^{−1}]; m²/day or USgal/day/ft)
$Q$ is the pumping rate ([L^{3}T^{−1}]; m³/day or USgal/day), and
$h_0 - h$ is the drawdown ([L]; m or ft)

The specific capacity of a well is also a function of the pumping rate it is determined at. Due to non-linear well losses the specific capacity will decrease with higher pumping rates. This complication makes the absolute value of specific capacity of little use; though it is useful for comparing the efficiency of the same well through time (e.g., to see if the well requires rehabilitation).

== See also ==
- Hydrogeology
- Aquifer and Groundwater
