= Specific storage =

Amount of water an aquifer releases while staying saturated

In the field of hydrogeology, storage properties are physical properties that characterize the capacity of an aquifer to release groundwater. These properties are storativity (S), specific storage (S_{s}) and specific yield (S_{y}). According to Groundwater, by Freeze and Cherry (1979), specific storage, $S_s$ [m^{−1}], of a saturated aquifer is defined as the volume of water that a unit volume of the aquifer releases from storage under a unit decline in hydraulic head.

They are often determined using some combination of field tests (e.g., aquifer tests) and laboratory tests on aquifer material samples. Recently, these properties have been also determined using remote sensing data derived from Interferometric synthetic-aperture radar.

== Storativity ==
=== Definition ===
Storativity or the storage coefficient is the volume of water released from storage per unit decline in hydraulic head in the aquifer, per unit area of the aquifer. Storativity is a dimensionless quantity, and is always greater than 0.

$$S = \frac{dV_w}{dh}\frac{1}{A} = S_s b + S_y \,$$

- $V_w$ is the volume of water released from storage ([L^{3}]);
- $h$ is the hydraulic head ([L])
- $S_s$ is the specific storage
- $S_y$ is the specific yield
- $b$ is the thickness of aquifer
- $A$ is the area ([L^{2}])

==== Confined ====
For a confined aquifer or aquitard, storativity is the vertically integrated specific storage value. Specific storage is the volume of water released from one unit volume of the aquifer under one unit decline in head. This is related to both the compressibility of the aquifer and the compressibility of the water itself. Assuming the aquifer or aquitard is homogeneous:

$$S=S_s b \,$$

==== Unconfined ====
For an unconfined aquifer, storativity is approximately equal to the specific yield ($S_y$) since the release from specific storage ($S_s$) is typically orders of magnitude less ($S_s b \ll \!\ S_y$).

$$S=S_y \,$$

The specific storage is the amount of water that a portion of an aquifer releases from storage, per unit mass or volume of the aquifer, per unit change in hydraulic head, while remaining fully saturated.

Mass specific storage is the mass of water that an aquifer releases from storage, per mass of aquifer, per unit decline in hydraulic head:

$$(S_s)_m = \frac{1}{m_a}\frac{dm_w}{dh}$$

where

$(S_s)_m$ is the mass specific storage ([L^{−1}]);
$m_a$ is the mass of that portion of the aquifer from which the water is released ([M]);
$dm_w$ is the mass of water released from storage ([M]); and
$dh$ is the decline in hydraulic head ([L]).

Volumetric specific storage (or volume-specific storage) is the volume of water that an aquifer releases from storage, per volume of the aquifer, per unit decline in hydraulic head (Freeze and Cherry, 1979):

$$S_s = \frac{1}{V_a}\frac{dV_w}{dh} = \frac{1}{V_a}\frac{dV_w}{dp}\frac{dp}{dh}= \frac{1}{V_a}\frac{dV_w}{dp}\gamma_w$$

where

$S_s$ is the volumetric specific storage ([L^{−1}]);
$V_a$ is the bulk volume of that portion of the aquifer from which the water is released ([L^{3}]);
$dV_w$ is the volume of water released from storage ([L^{3}]);
$dp$ is the decline in pressure(N•m^{−2} or [ML^{−1}T^{−2}]) ;
$dh$ is the decline in hydraulic head ([L]) and
$\gamma_w$ is the specific weight of water (N•m^{−3} or [ML^{−2}T^{−2}]).

In hydrogeology, volumetric specific storage is much more commonly encountered than mass specific storage. Consequently, the term specific storage generally refers to volumetric specific storage.

In terms of measurable physical properties, specific storage can be expressed as

$$S_s = \gamma_w (\beta_p + n \cdot \beta_w)$$

where

$\gamma_w$ is the specific weight of water (N•m^{−3} or [ML^{−2}T^{−2}])
$n$ is the porosity of the material (dimensionless ratio between 0 and 1)
$\beta_p$ is the compressibility of the bulk aquifer material (m^{2}N^{−1} or [LM^{−1}T^{2}]), and
$\beta_w$ is the compressibility of water (m^{2}N^{−1} or [LM^{−1}T^{2}])

The compressibility terms relate a given change in stress to a change in volume (a strain). These two terms can be defined as:

$$\beta_p = -\frac{dV_t}{d\sigma_e}\frac{1}{V_t}$$
$$\beta_w = -\frac{dV_w}{dp}\frac{1}{V_w}$$

where

$\sigma_e$ is the effective stress (N/m^{2} or [MLT^{−2}/L^{2}])

These equations relate a change in total or water volume ($V_t$ or $V_w$) per change in applied stress (effective stress — $\sigma_e$ or pore pressure — $p$) per unit volume. The compressibilities (and therefore also S_{s}) can be estimated from laboratory consolidation tests (in an apparatus called a consolidometer), using the consolidation theory of soil mechanics (developed by Karl Terzaghi).

=== Determination of the storage coefficient of aquifer systems ===
==== Aquifer-test analysis ====
Aquifer-test analyses provide estimates of aquifer-system storage coefficients by examining the drawdown and recovery responses of water levels in wells to applied stresses, typically induced by pumping from nearby wells.

==== Stress-strain analysis ====
Elastic and inelastic skeletal storage coefficients can be estimated through a graphical method developed by Riley. This method involves plotting the applied stress (hydraulic head) on the y-axis against vertical strain or displacement (compaction) on the x-axis. The inverse slopes of the dominant linear trends in these compaction-head trajectories indicate the skeletal storage coefficients. The displacements used to build the stress-strain curve can be determined by extensometers, InSAR or levelling.

==== Laboratory consolidation tests ====
Laboratory consolidation tests yield measurements of the coefficient of consolidation within the inelastic range and provide estimates of vertical hydraulic conductivity. The inelastic skeletal specific storage of the sample can be determined by calculating the ratio of vertical hydraulic conductivity to the coefficient of consolidation.

==== Model simulations and calibration ====
Simulations of land subsidence incorporate data on aquifer-system storage and hydraulic conductivity. Calibrating these models can lead to optimized estimates of storage coefficients and vertical hydraulic conductivity.

== Specific yield ==
Values of specific yield
Material	Specific Yield (%)		
Material	min	avg	max
Unconsolidated deposits
Clay	0	2	5
Sandy clay (mud)	3	7	12
Silt	3	8	19
Fine sand	10	21	28
Medium sand	15	26	32
Coarse sand	20	27	35
Gravelly sand	20	25	35
Fine gravel	21	25	35
Medium gravel	13	23	26
Coarse gravel	12	22	26
Consolidated deposits
Fine-grained sandstone		21	
Medium-grained sandstone		27	
Limestone		14	
Schist		26	
Siltstone		12	
Tuff		21	
Other deposits
Dune sand		38	
Loess		18	
Peat		44	
Till, predominantly silt		6	
Till, predominantly sand		16	
Till, predominantly gravel		16	

Specific yield, also known as the drainable porosity, is a ratio and is the volumetric fraction of the bulk aquifer volume that a given aquifer will yield when all the water is allowed to drain out of it under the forces of gravity:

$$S_y = \frac{V_{wd}}{V_T}$$

where

$V_{wd}$ is the volume of water drained, and
$V_T$ is the total rock or material volume

It is primarily used for unconfined aquifers since the elastic storage component, $S_s$, is relatively small and usually has an insignificant contribution. Specific yield can be close to effective porosity, but several subtleties make this value more complicated than it seems. Some water always remains in the formation, even after drainage; it clings to the grains of sand and clay. Also, the value of a specific yield may not be fully realized for a very long time due to complications caused by unsaturated flow. Problems related to unsaturated flow are simulated using the numerical solution of Richards Equation, which requires estimation of the specific yield, or the numerical solution of the Soil Moisture Velocity Equation, which does not require estimation of the specific yield.

== See also ==
- Aquifer test
- Soil mechanics
- Groundwater flow equation describes how these terms are used in the context of solving groundwater flow problems
