= EnDrain =

Software

EnDrain software
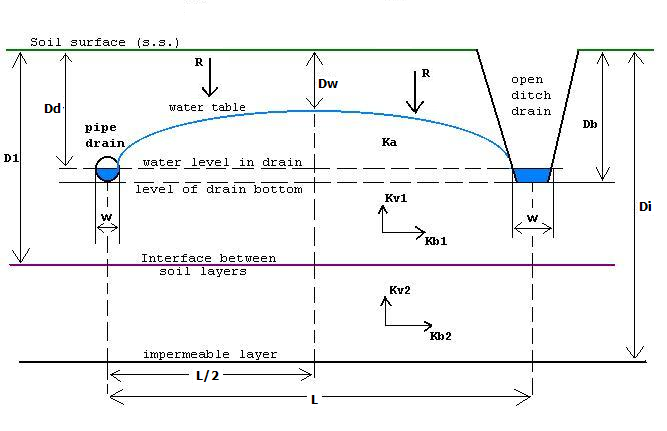
- Sketch of drainage conditions handled by EnDrain
- Developer: Institute for Land Reclamation and Improvement (ILRI)
- Written in: Delphi
- Operating system: Microsoft Windows
- Available in: English
- License: Freeware
- Website: EnDrain

EnDrain is software for the calculation of a subsurface drainage system in agricultural land. The EnDrain program computes the water flow discharged by drains, the hydraulic head losses and the distance between drains, also obtaining the curve described by water-table level. Such calculations are necessary to design a drainage system in the framework of an irrigation system for water table and soil salinity control.

== Particulars ==
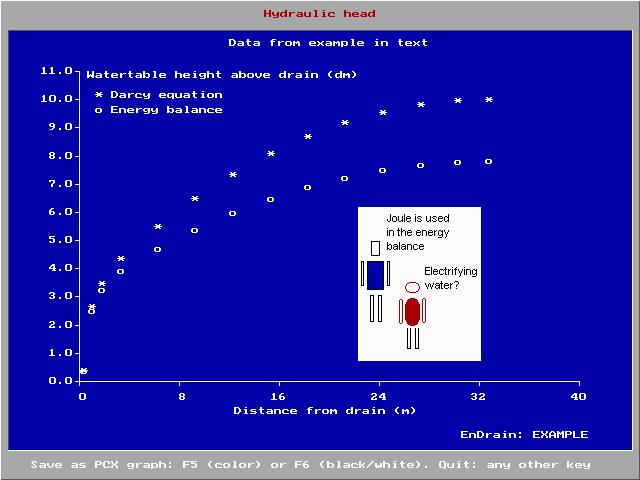
Example of an EnDrain result for both the Darcy-Dupuit and the energy balance concepts

EnDrain is a model for a drainage equation. It offers the possibility to calculate drain spacing given the elevation of the water table or, alternatively, the elevation given the spacing. It can also calculate the hydraulic conductivity, given spacing and elevation.

The program allows the utilization of three different soil layers, each of them with their own permeability and hydraulic conductivity (vertical and horizontal, anisotropy), one layer being above and two layers below drain level.

The calculation of distances between drains and other parameters is based on the concept of the energy balance of groundwater flow and the hydraulic equivalent of Joule's law. For comparison, the classical concepts based on theories of Darcy and Dupuit are also used.

== See also ==
- Well drainage
