= DPHM-RS =

DPHM-RS (Semi-Distributed Physically based Hydrologic Model using Remote Sensing and GIS) is a semi-distributed hydrologic model developed at University of Alberta, Canada.

== Model description ==
The semi-distributed DPHM-RS (Semi-Distributed Physically based Hydrologic Model using Remote Sensing and GIS) sub-divides a river basin to a number of sub-basins, computes the evapotranspiration, soil moisture and surface runoff using energy and rainfall forcing data in a sub-basin scale. It consists of six basic components: interception of rainfall, evapotranspiration, soil moisture, saturated subsurface flow, surface flow and channel routing, as described in Biftu and Gan.

The interception of precipitation from the atmosphere by the canopy is modeled using the Rutter Interception Model. The land surface evaporation and vegetation transpiration are computed separately using the Two Source Model of Shuttleworth and Gurney, which is based on the energy balance above canopy, within canopy and at soil surface. This model solves the non-linear equations based on the energy balance for the canopy, surface, and air temperatures at canopy height, evaporation from soil surface and transpiration from vegetation. A soil profile of three homogeneous layers (active, transmission and saturated layers) is used to model the soil moisture on the basis of water balance between layers. The active layer is 15–30 cm thick and it simulates the rapid changes of soil moisture content under high frequency atmospheric forcing. The transmission zone lies between the base of the active layer and the top of the capillary fringe and so it more characterizes the seasonal (instead of transient) changes of soil moisture. In modeling the unsaturated flow component of soil water, the water transport is assumed vertical and non-interactive between sub-basins. The lower boundary of the unsaturated zone is the top of capillary fringe controlled by the local average ground water table derived from the catchment average water table and topographic soil index which include the spatial variability of the topographic and soil parameters. Starting with an observed value from the surrounding wells of the modeled basin, the temporal changes in the average ground water depth is based on the water balance analysis for the whole catchment, and the rate of change of the average ground water table is assumed to be the rate of change of local water table.

After simulating the soil moisture, the saturation and Hortonian infiltration excess for vegetated and bare soil are computed to generate the surface runoff for each sub-basin. Philip's equation is used to compute the infiltration capacity of soil, and the surface runoff is distributed temporally using a time lag response function obtained from a reference rainfall excess of 1 cm depth applied to each grid cell within the sub-basin for one time step. Then for each grid cell, which has the resolution of the digital elevation model (DEM) used, the flow is routed according to the kinematic wave equation from cell to cell based on eight possible flow directions until the total runoff water for the sub-basin is completely routed. The resulting runoff becomes a lateral inflow to the stream channel within the sub-basin and these flows are routed through the drainage network by the Muskingum-Cunge routing method whose variable parameters are evaluated by an iterative four point approach.

== See also ==
- Environmental engineering is a broad category hydrogeology fits into,
- Groundwater energy balance: groundwater flow equations based on the energy balance.
- Fault zone hydrogeology: field specifically analyzing hydrogeology in fault zones.
- Hydrology (agriculture)
- Isotope hydrology is often used to understand sources and travel times in groundwater systems.
- SahysMod is a spatial agro-hydro-salinity model with groundwater flow in a polygonal network.
- Water cycle, hydrosphere and water resources are larger concepts which hydrogeology is a part of.
