= Woofz =

Mobile application for dog training

- Original author: Natalia Shahmetova
- Developer: Nove8 Ltd
- Initial release: November 24, 2020
- Operating system: iOS, Android
- Platform: Mobile application
- Available in: English, French, German, Italian, Japanese, Polish, Portuguese, Romanian, Simplified Chinese, Spanish, Traditional Chinese, Turkish
- Website: https://www.woofz.com/

Woofz is a subscription-based mobile application developed by Nove8 Ltd for dog training. The app has behavioural training programs with video lessons, wellness monitoring tools such as activity tracking, a wellness dashboard, and routines for health check-ins. It has 21 million downloads and generated $20 million in revenue.

== History ==
Woofz was developed in September 2020 as a prototype, combining dog-training programs with health and wellness tracking. The application was first released on 24 November 2020.

In February–March 2022, the application introduced the Training Journey Map, a visual training progression system that structured behavioural programs into sequential stages. Japanese and Polish was added in 2023, followed by Italian in mid-2024, Turkish in September 2024 and Romanian in May 2025. Also in 2025, the Explore tab was released, adding access to dog training commands, programs, and interactive games.

In September 2025, the Woofz Wellness Dashboard was introduced, providing wellness highlights and weekly health check-ins for dogs. In October 2025, the application added a breed identification by photo feature.

== Features ==
Woofz is a mobile application for dog training and pet wellness, providing tools to manage training routines and daily care. The app combines behavioral training with basic wellness and activity monitoring. The training functionality is based on short, video lessons and programs that can be organized by a dog's breed, behavior, and training goals. The application uses interactive training tools, positive reinforcement methods, and progress tracking for commands and skills. The wellness component includes tools for tracking physical activity, logging nutrition and hydration, and performing routine at-home health checks. It provides automated wellness indicators, reminders, and educational content related to daily dog care and preventive wellbeing. Additional features include a digital training clicker, a walking tracker, calendar-based reminders, and support for managing multiple dog profiles with shared family access. The application also contains knowledge base with programs for common behavioral issues, routine guides, and calming audio content. Woofz also offers in-app chat assistance for dog-related questions, as well as optional one-to-one video sessions with professional dog trainers.
