= Agricultural hydrology =

Study of agricultural water management, especially irrigation and drainage

Agricultural hydrology is the study of water balance components intervening in agricultural water management, especially in irrigation and drainage.

Illustration of some water balance components

== Water balance components ==
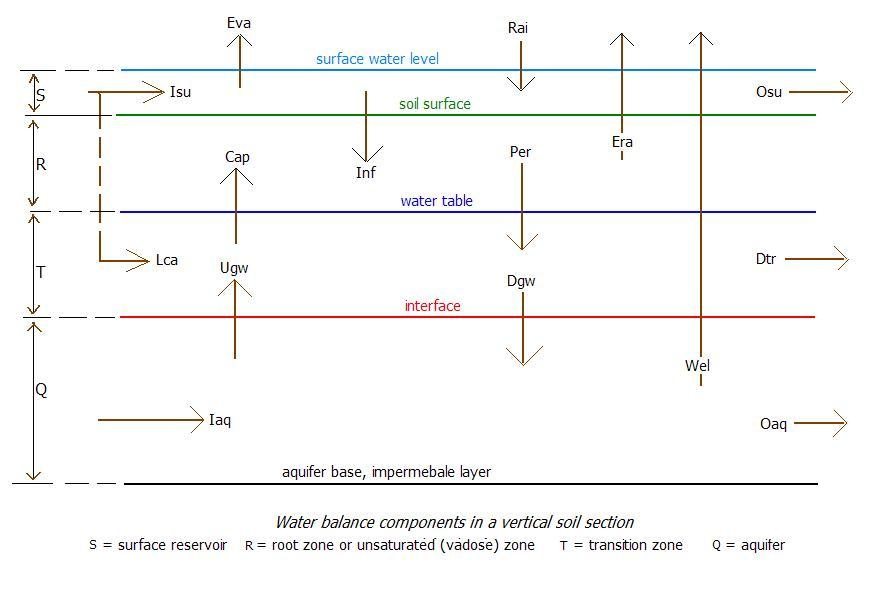
Water balance components in agricultural land

The water balance components can be grouped into components corresponding to zones in a vertical cross-section in the soil forming reservoirs with inflow, outflow and storage of water:

1. the surface reservoir (S)
2. the root zone or unsaturated (vadose zone) (R) with mainly vertical flows
3. the aquifer (Q) with mainly horizontal flows
4. a transition zone (T) in which vertical and horizontal flows are converted

The general water balance reads:

- inflow = outflow + change of storage

and it is applicable to each of the reservoirs or a combination thereof.

In the following balances it is assumed that the water table is inside the transition zone.

=== Surface water balance ===
The incoming water balance components into the surface reservoir (S) are:

1. Rai – Vertically incoming water to the surface e.g.: precipitation (including snow), rainfall, sprinkler irrigation
2. Isu – Horizontally incoming surface water. This can consist of natural inundation or surface irrigation

The outgoing water balance components from the surface reservoir (S) are:

1. Eva – Evaporation from open water on the soil surface (see Penman equation)
2. Osu – Surface runoff (natural) or surface drainage (artificial)
3. Inf – Infiltration of water through the soil surface into the root zone

The surface water balance reads:

- Rai + Isu = Eva + Inf + Osu + Ws, where Ws is the change of water storage on top of the soil surface

Surface runoff in the Curve Number method

Example of a surface water balance
An example is given of surface runoff according to the Curve number method. The applicable equation is:
- Osu = (Rai – Ws)^{2} / (Pp – Ws + Rm)
where Rm is the maximum retention of the area for which the method is used Normally one finds that Ws = 0.2 Rm and the value of Rm depends on the soil characteristics. The Curve Number method provides tables for these relations. The method yields cumulative runoff values. To obtain runoff intensity values or runoff velocity (volume per unit of time) the cumulative duration is to be divided into sequential time steps (for example in hours).

=== Root zone water balance ===
The incoming water balance components into the root zone (R) are:

1. Inf – Infiltration of water through the soil surface into the root zone
2. Cap – Capillary rise of water from the transition zone

The outgoing water balance components from the surface reservoir (R) are:

1. Era – Actual evaporation or evapotranspiration from the root zone
2. Per – Percolation of water from the unsaturated root zone into the transition zone

The root zone water balance reads:

- Inf + Cap = Era + Per + Wr, where Wr is the change of water storage in the root zone

=== Transition zone water balance ===
The incoming water balance components into the transition zone (T) are:

1. Per – Percolation of water from the unsaturated root zone into the transition zone
2. Lca – Infiltration of water from river, canal or drainage systems into the transition zone, often referred to as deep seepage losses
3. Ugw – Vertically upward seepage of water from the aquifer into the saturated transition zone

The outgoing water balance components from the transition zone (T) are:

1. Cap – Capillary rise of water into the root zone
2. Dtr – Artificial horizontal subsurface drainage, see also Drainage system (agriculture)
3. Dgw – Vertically downward drainage of water from the saturated transition zone into the aquifer

The water balance of the transition zone reads:

- Per + Lca + Ugw = Cap + Dtr + Dgw + Wt, where Wt is the change of water storage in the transition zone noticeable as a change of the level of the water table.

=== Aquifer water balance ===
The incoming water balance components into the aquifer (Q) are:

1. Dgw – Vertically downward drainage of water from the saturated transition zone into the aquifer
2. Iaq – Horizontally incoming groundwater into the aquifer

The outgoing water balance components from the aquifer (Q) are:

1. Ugw – Vertically upward seepage of water from the aquifer into the saturated transition zone
2. Oaq – Horizontally outgoing groundwater from the aquifer
3. Wel – Discharge from (tube)wells placed in the aquifer

The water balance of the aquifer reads:

- Dgw + Iaq = Ugw + Wel + Oaq + Wq

where Wq is the change of water storage in the aquifer noticeable as a change of the artesian pressure.

== Specific water balances ==
=== Combined balances ===
Water balances can be made for a combination of two bordering vertical soil zones discerned, whereby the components constituting the inflow and outflow from one zone to the other will disappear.
In long term water balances (month, season, year), the storage terms are often negligible small. Omitting these leads to steady state or equilibrium water balances.

Combination of surface reservoir (S)and root zone (R) in steady state yields the topsoil water balance :

- Rai + Isu + Cap = Eva + Era + Osu + Per, where the linkage factor Inf has disappeared.

Combination of root zone (R) and transition zone (T) in steady state yields the subsoil water balance :

- Inf + Lca + Ugw = Era + Dtr + Dgw, where Wr the linkage factors Per and Cap have disappeared.

Combination of transition zone (T) and aquifer (Q) in steady state yields the geohydrologic water balance :

- Per + Lca + Iaq = Cap + Dtr + Wel + Oaq, where Wr the linkage factors Ugw and Dgw have disappeared.

Combining the uppermost three water balances in steady state gives the agronomic water balance :

- Rai + Isu + Lca + Ugw = Eva + Era + Osu + Dtr + Dgw, where the linkage factors Inf, Per and Cap have disappeared.

Combining all four water balances in steady state gives the overall water balance :

- Rai + Isu + Lca + Iaq = Eva + Era + Osu + Dtr + Wel + Oaq, where the linkage factors Inf, Per, Cap, Ugw and Dgw have disappeared.

Diagram for reuse of groundwater for irrigation by wells

Example of an overall water balance
An example is given of the reuse of groundwater for irrigation by pumped wells. The total irrigation and the infiltration are:
- Inf = Irr + Wel, where Irr = surface irrigation from the canal system, and Wel = the irrigation from wells
The field irrigation efficiency (Ff < 1) is:
- Ff = Era / Inf, where Era = the evapotranspiration of the crop (consumptive use)
The value of Era is less than Inf, there is an excess of irrigation that percolates down to the subsoil (Per):
- Per = Irr + Wel – Era, or:
- Per = (1 − Ff) (Irr + Wel)
The percolation Per is pumped up again by wells for irrigation (Wel), hence:
- Wel = Per, or:
- Wel = (1 − Ff) (Irr + Wel), and therefore:
- Wel / Irr = (1 − Ff) / Ff
With this equation the following table can be prepared:

Ff	0.20	0.25	0.33	0.50	0.75
Well / Irr	4	3	2	1	0.33

It can be seen that with low irrigation efficiency the amount of water pumped by the wells (Wel) is several time greater than the amount of irrigation water brought in by the canal system (Irr). This is due to the fact that a drop of water must be recirculated on the average several times before it is used by the plants.

=== Water table outside transition zone ===
When the water table is above the soil surface, the balances containing the components Inf, Per, Cap are not appropriate as they do not exist. When the water table is inside the root zone, the balances containing the components Per, Cap are not appropriate as they do not exist. When the water table is below the transition zone, only the aquifer balance is appropriate.

=== Reduced number of zones ===
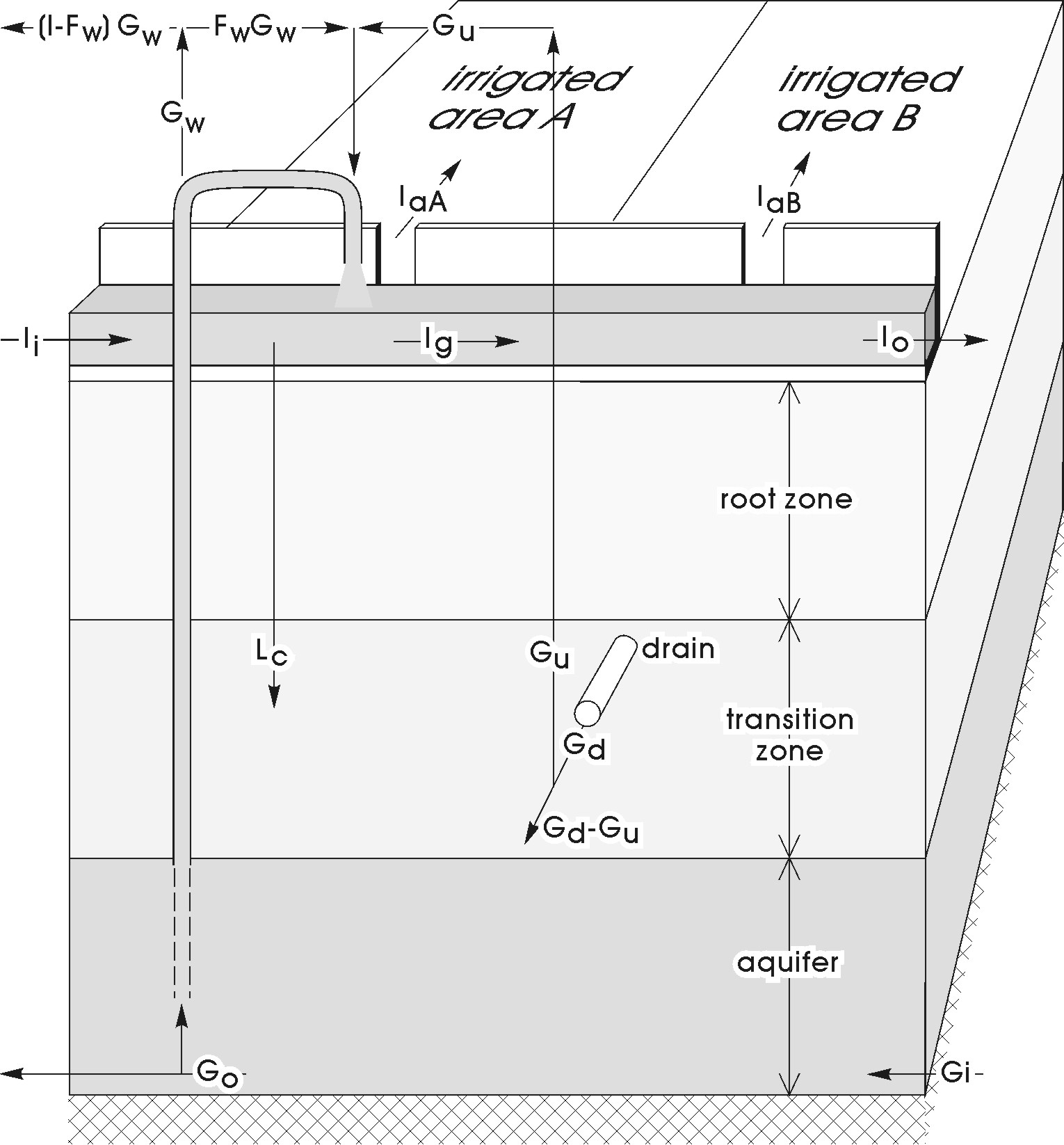
Saltmod water balance components

Under specific conditions it may be that no aquifer, transition zone or root zone is present. Water balances can be made omitting the absent zones.

=== Net and excess values ===
Vertical hydrological components along the boundary between two zones with arrows in the same direction can be combined into net values .
For example, : Npc = Per − Cap (net percolation), Ncp = Cap − Per (net capillary rise).
Horizontal hydrological components in the same zone with arrows in same direction can be combined into excess values .
For example, : Egio = Iaq − Oaq (excess groundwater inflow over outflow), Egoi = Oaq − Iaq (excess groundwater outflow over inflow).

=== Salt balances ===
Agricultural water balances are also used in the salt balances of irrigated lands.
Further, the salt and water balances are used in agro-hydro-salinity-drainage models like Saltmod.
Equally, they are used in groundwater salinity models like SahysMod which is a spatial variation of SaltMod using a polygonal network.

== Irrigation and drainage requirements ==
The irrigation requirement (Irr) can be calculated from the topsoil water balance, the agronomic water balance or the overall water balance, as defined in the section "Combined balances", depending on the availability of data on the water balance components.
Considering surface irrigation, assuming the evaporation of surface water is negligibly small (Eva = 0), setting the actual evapotranspiration Era equal to the potential evapotranspiration (Epo) so that Era = Epo and setting the surface inflow Isu equal to Irr so that Isu = Irr, the balances give respectively:

- Irr = Epo + Osu + Per − Rai − Cap
- Irr = Epo + Osu + Dtr + Dgw − Rai − Lca − Ugw
- Irr = Epo + Osu + Dtr + Oaq − Rai − Lca − Iaq

Defining the irrigation efficiency as IEFF = Epo/Irr, i.e. the fraction of the irrigation water that is consumed by the crop, it is found respectively that :

- IEFF = 1 − (Osu + Per − Rai − Cap) / Irr
- IEFF = 1 − (Osu + Dtr + Dgw − Rai − Lca − Ugw) / Irr

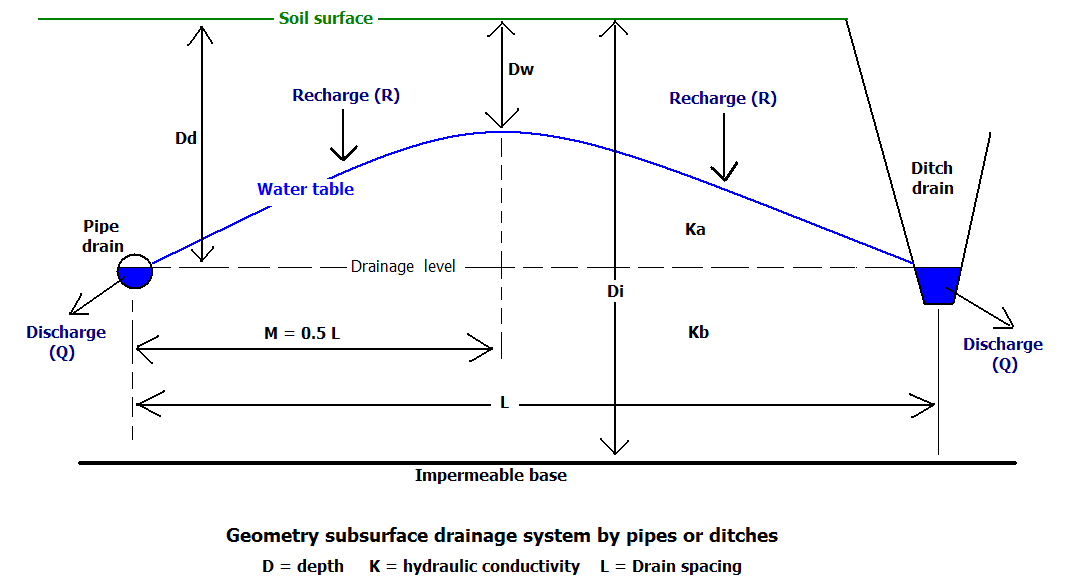
The drain discharge determines the drain spacing

- IEFF = 1 − (Osu + Dtr + Oaq − Rai − Lca − Iaq) / Irr

Likewise the safe yield of wells, extracting water from the aquifer without overexploitation, can be determined using the geohydrologic water balance or the overall water balance, as defined in the section "Combined balances", depending on the availability of data on the water balance components.

Similarly, the subsurface drainage requirement can be found from the drain discharge (Dtr) in the subsoil water balance, the agronomic water balance, the geohydrologic water balance or the overall water balance.

In the same fashion, the well drainage requirement can be found from well discharge (Wel) in the geohydrologic water balance or the overall water balance.

The subsurface drainage requirement and well drainage requirement play an important role in the design of agricultural drainage systems (references:, ).

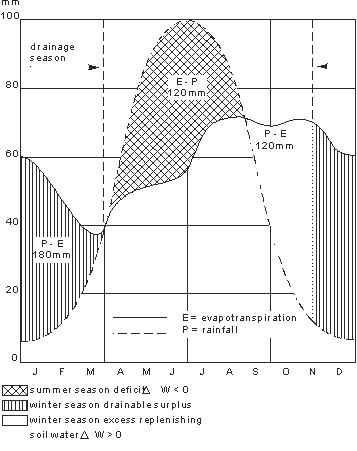
Average climatic data and drainage in the Netherlands

Example of drainage and irrigation requirements
The drainage and irrigation requirements in The Netherlands are derived from the climatic characteristics (see figure).

Climatic data in the figure (mm)	Summer Apr–Aug	Winter Sep–Mar	Annual
Precipitation P	360	360	720
Evaporation E	480	60	540
Change of storage ΔW	–120	+120	0
Drainage requirement D	0	180	180
Irrigation requirement	variable	0	variable

The quantity of water to be drained in a normal winter is:
- D = P – E – ΔW
According to the figure, the drainage period is from November to March (120 days) and the discharge of the drainage system is
D = 180 / 120 = 1.5 mm/day corresponding to 15 m^{3}/day per ha. During winters with more precipitation than normal, the drainage requirement increase accordingly. The irrigation requirement depends on the rooting depth of the crops, which determines their capacity to make use of the water stored in the soil after winter. Having a shallow rooting system, pastures need irrigation to an amount of about half of the storage depletion in summer. Practically, wheat does not require irrigation because it develops deeper roots while during the maturing period a dry soil is favorable. The analysis of cumulative frequency of climatic data plays an important role in the determination of the irrigation and drainage needs in the long run.

== See also ==
- Hydrology
