= Water balance =

Looks at how water moves in a closed system

Nile basin water balance

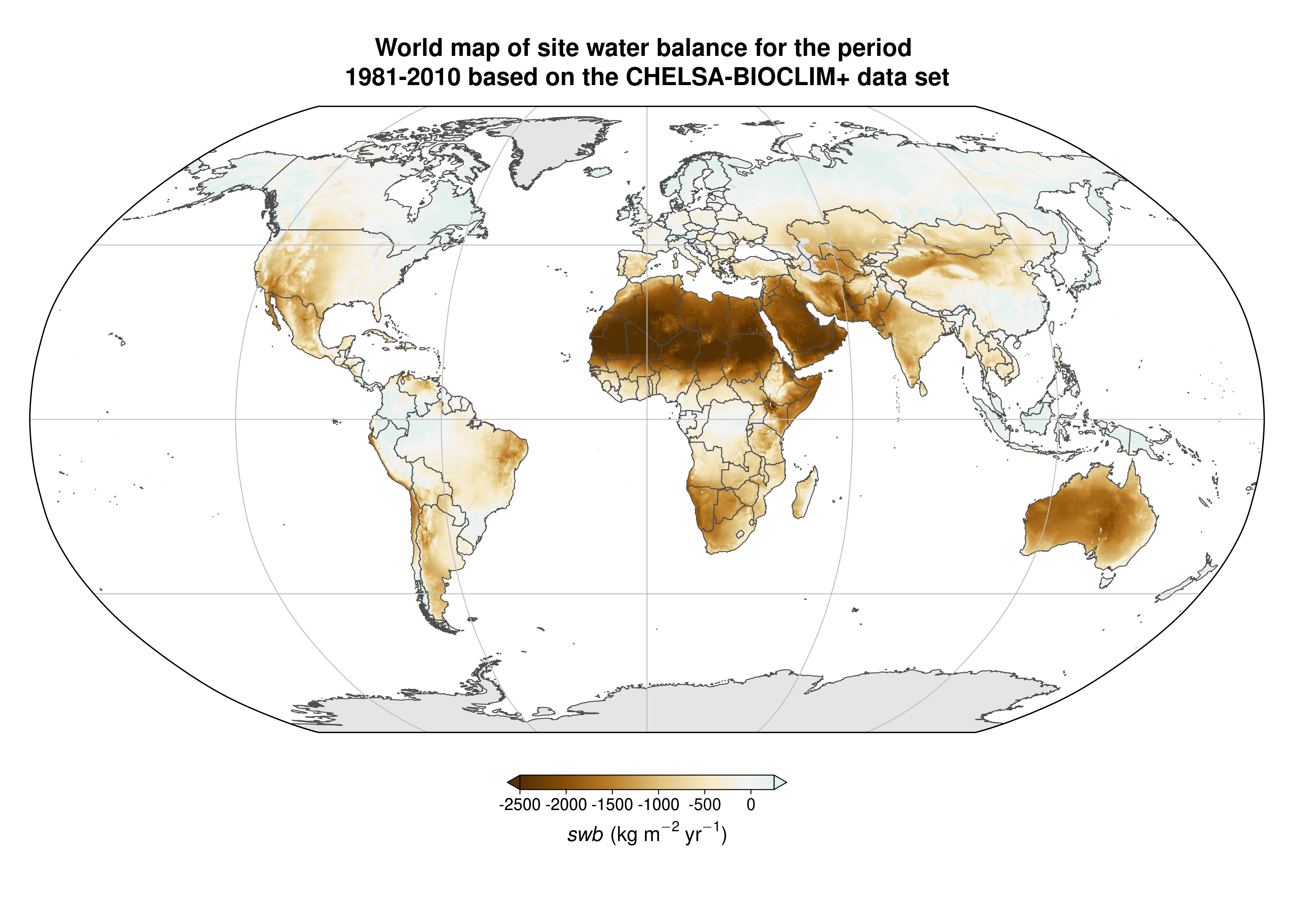
Global distribution of water balance in the soil averaged over the years 1981-2010 from the CHELSA-BIOCLIM+ data set

The law of water balance states that the inflows to any water system or area is equal to its outflows plus change in storage during a time interval. In hydrology, a water balance equation can be used to describe the flow of water in and out of a system. A system can be one of several hydrological or water domains, such as a column of soil, a drainage basin, an irrigation area or a city.

The water balance is also referred to as a water budget. Developing water budgets is a fundamental activity in the science of hydrology. According to the US Geological Survey:

An understanding of water budgets and underlying hydrologic processes provides a foundation for effective water-resource and environmental planning and management. Observed changes in water budgets of an area over time can be used to assess the effects of climate variability and human activities on water resources. Comparison of water budgets from different areas allows the effects of factors such as geology, soils, vegetation, and land use on the hydrologic cycle to be quantified.

== Equation for a basin ==
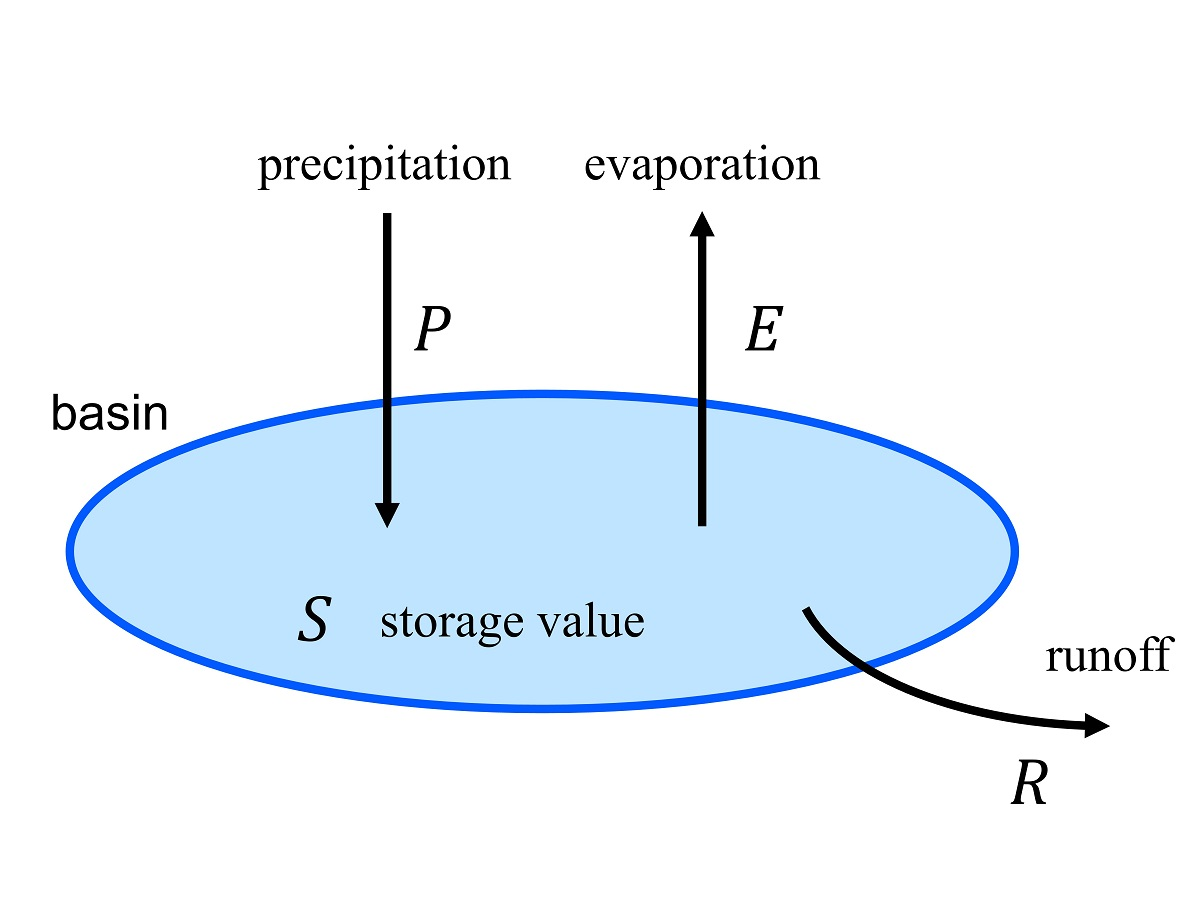
Water balance in a basin

A general water balance equation is:

P = Q + ET + ΔS

where

P is precipitation
Q is streamflow
ET is evapotranspiration
ΔS is the change in storage (in soil or the bedrock / groundwater)

This equation uses the principles of conservation of mass in a closed system, whereby any water entering a system (via precipitation), must be transferred into either evaporation, transpiration, surface runoff (eventually reaching the channel and leaving in the form of river discharge), or stored in the ground. This equation requires the system to be closed, and where it is not (for example when surface runoff contributes to a different basin), this must be taken into account.

Extensive water balances are discussed in agricultural hydrology.

A water balance can be used to help manage water supply and predict where there may be water shortages. It is also used in irrigation, runoff assessment (e.g. through the RainOff model), flood control and pollution control. Further it is used in the design of subsurface drainage systems which may be horizontal (i.e. using pipes, tile drains or ditches) or vertical (drainage by wells). To estimate the drainage requirement, the use of a hydrogeological water balance and a groundwater model (e.g. SahysMod) may be instrumental.

The water balance can be illustrated using a water balance graph which plots levels of precipitation and evapotranspiration often on a monthly scale.

Several monthly water balance models had been developed for several conditions and purposes. Monthly water balance models had been studied since the 1940s.

== Water Balance of a System ==
“Making water available for its many uses and users requires tools and institutions to transform it from a natural resource to one providing services”. This means that there are two types of water systems: Water Resource System (WRS) and Water Use System (WUS).

A WRS, such as a river, an aquifer or a lake, must obey water balance. For example, the volume of water that goes into an aquifer must be equal to the amount that leaves it plus its change in storage. Under various drivers, such as, climate change, population increase, and bad management, water storage of many WRS is decreasing, say per decade. This means that the volume of water in a WRS decreased after a decade, i.e., inflow was less than outflow during that time interval.

In general, a WUS is a water construct of a user, such as a city, an industry, an irrigation zone, or a region, and not a geographic area. The schematic of a WUS shows the inflows and the outflows. For a WUS, change in storage is negligible (relative to its inflow) under a proper time interval, hence water balance becomes inflow equal to outflow with nine Water Path Types (WPT):

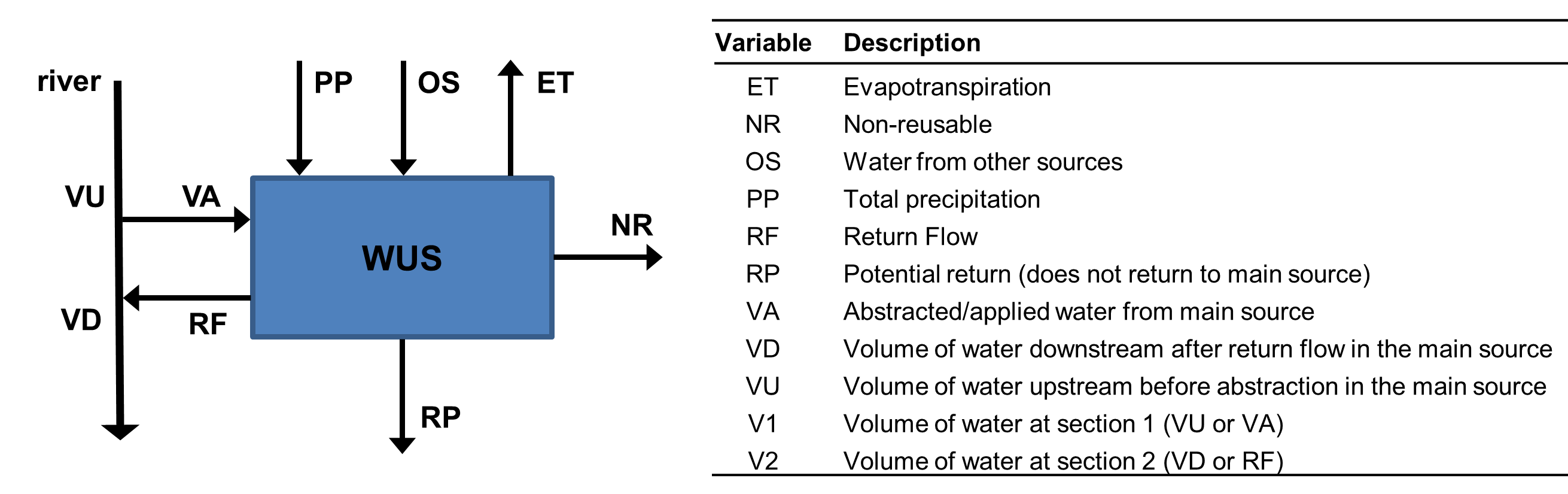
A typical schematic of a Water Use System (WUS) with its fixed nine Water Path Types

$VA+OS+PP = ET+NR+RF+RP$

Of course, instead of a river, it could be an aquifer that supplies water to a WUS as a main source. Let us briefly examine an urban water supply on an annual basis as a simplified example. It has negligible ET and PP (WUS is a piped network), has some limited amount of water from groundwater (OS), has return flow to the main source (RF) after passing through a Wastewater Treatment Plant, and RP type has various Water Path Instances (WPI), such as leakage, and water taken to irrigate green zones. Considering that the annual change in storage of an urban area is negligible, water balance equation becomes

$VA_{riv}+OS_{gw}=NR+RF_{wwtp}+RP_{leak}+RP_{irr}$

== Models ==
Several diagnostic measures in hydrology can be used to select and evaluate the performance of water balance models.

== Applications ==
- Evaluate the components of the hydrologic cycle
- Snowmelt simulation
- Climate change impact assessment
- Flow forecasting and project design
- Assess agricultural water management

== Types ==
- Models using precipitation (rainfall) as input
- Models using rainfall and temperature as input
- Models using rainfall and potential evaporation as input
- Models using daily input data

== See also ==
- Hydrology (agriculture)
- Catchment hydrology
- Runoff model (reservoir)
- Water cycle
