= Farm water =

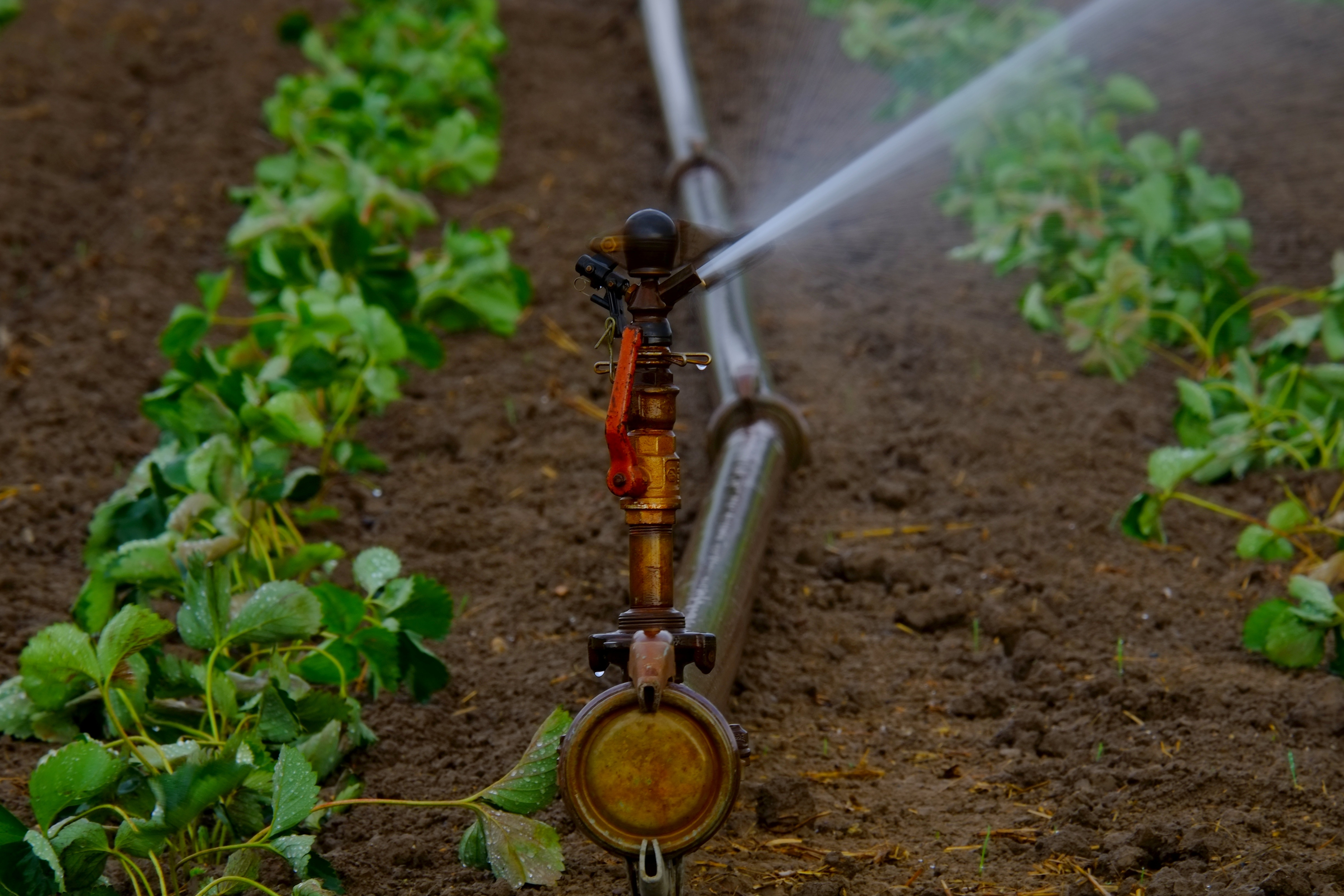
An agricultural sprinkler

Farm water, also known as agricultural water, is water committed for use in the production of food and fibre and collecting for further resources. In the US, some 80% of the fresh water withdrawn from rivers and groundwater is used to produce food and other agricultural products. Farm water may include water used in the irrigation of crops or the watering of livestock. Its study is called agricultural hydrology.

Agriculutal water use 1900 - 2020 compared to industry and municipality water use.

Water is one of the most fundamental parts of the global economy. In areas without healthy water resources or sanitation services, economic growth cannot be sustained. Without access to clean water, nearly every industry would suffer, most notably agriculture. As water scarcity grows as a global concern, food security is also brought into consideration. A recent example of this could be the drought in California; for every $100 spent on foods from this state, a consumer is projected to pay up to $15 additionally.

== Livestock water use ==
Livestock and meat production have some of the largest water footprints of the agricultural industry, taking nearly 1,800 gallons of water to produce one pound of beef and 576 gallons for pork. About 108 gallons of water are needed to harvest one pound of corn. Livestock production is also one of the most resource-intensive agricultural outputs. This is largely due to their large feed conversion ratio. Livestock's large water consumption may also be attributed to the amount of time needed to raise an animal to slaughter. Again, in an invalid contrast to corn, which grows to maturity in about 100 days, about 995 days are needed to grow cattle. The global "food animal" population is just over 20 billion creatures; with 7+ billion humans, this equates to about 2.85 animals per human.

=== Cattle ===
The beef and dairy industries are the most lucrative branches of the U.S. agricultural industry, but they are also the most resource intensive. To date, beef is the most popular of the meats; the U.S. alone produced 25.8 billion pounds in 2013. In this same year, 201.2 billion pounds of milk were produced. These cattle are mostly raised in centralized animal feeding operations, or CAFOs. Typically, a mature cow consumes 7 to 24 gallons of water a day; lactating cows require about twice as much water. The amount of water that cattle may drink in a day also depends upon the temperature.
Cattle have a feed conversion ratio of 6:1, for every six pounds of food consumed, the animal should gain one pound. Thus, there is also a substantial "indirect" need for water in order to grow the feed for the livestock. Growing the amount of feed grains necessary for raising livestock accounts for 56 percent of the U.S. water consumption. Of a 1,000 pound cow, only 430 pounds make it to the retail markets. This 18 percent loss, creates an even greater demand for cattle, being that CAFOs must make up for this lost profitable weight, by increasing the number of cows that they raise.

Water scarcity is not necessarily a new issue, however, cattle ranchers in America have been cutting herd sizes since the 1950s in efforts to curb water and manufacturing costs. This shift has led to more efficient feeding and health methods, allowing ranchers to harvest more beef per animal. The rising popularity of these CAFOs are creating a larger demand for water, however. Grass-fed or grazing cows consume about twelve percent more water through the ingestion of live plants, than those cows who are fed dried grains.

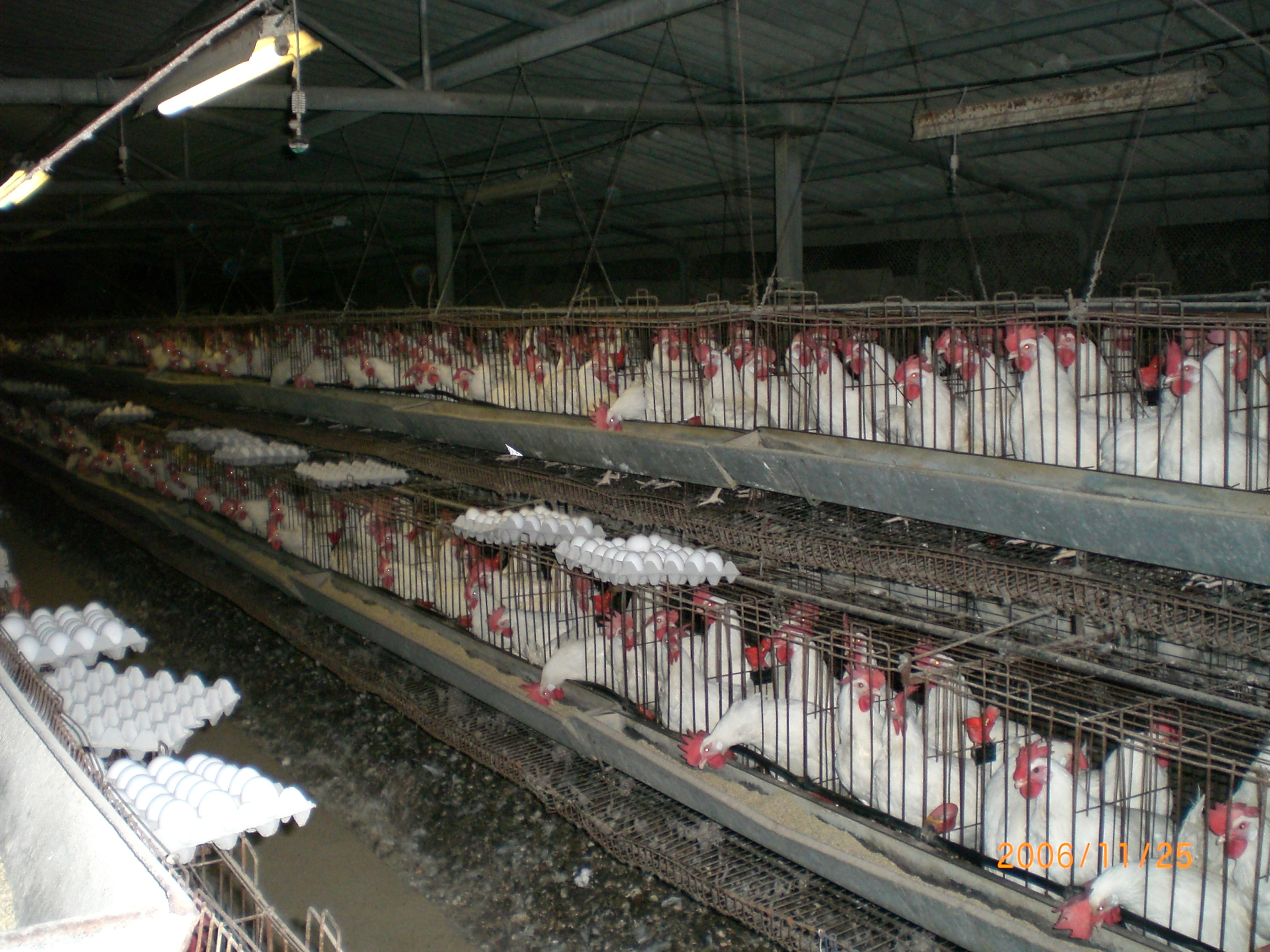
Chickens in industrial coops

=== Poultry and fowl ===
Water is one of the most crucial aspects of poultry raising, as like all animals, they use this to carry food through their system, assist in digestion, and regulate body temperature. Farmers monitor flock water consumption to measure the overall health of their birds. As birds grow older they consume more feed and about three times as much water because they are three times larger. In just three weeks, a 1000-bird flock's water consumption should increase by about 10 gallons a day. Water consumption is also influenced by temperature. In hot weather, birds pant to keep cool, thus losing much of their water. A study based in Ohio showed that 67% of water sampled near poultry farms contained antibiotics.

== Horticulture water use ==
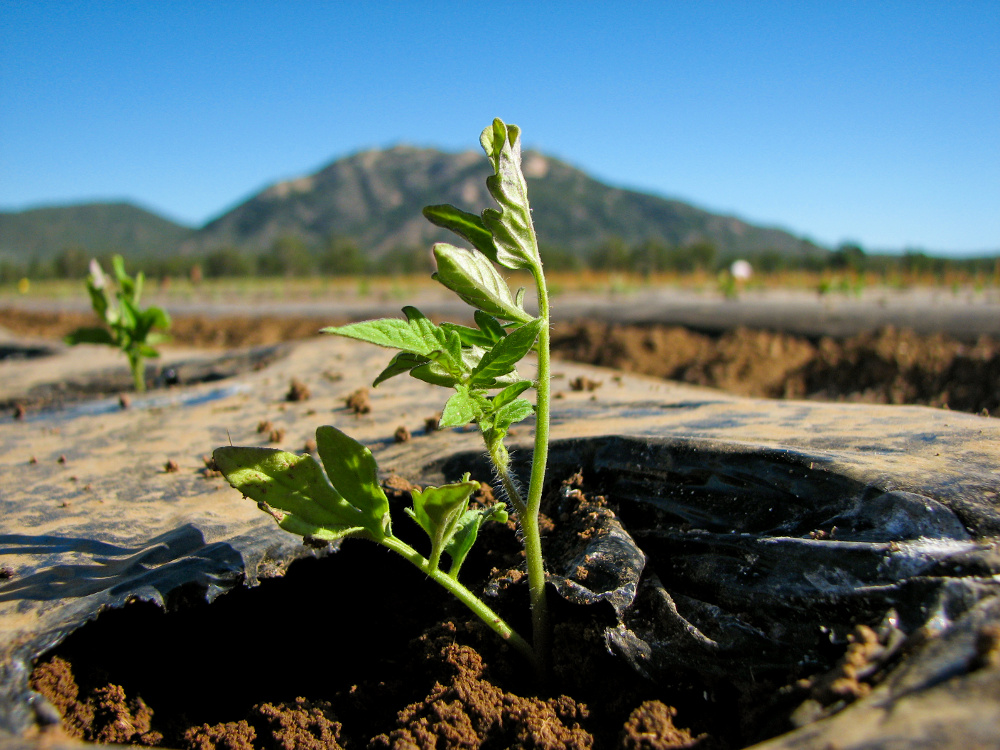
A newly planted tomato plant on a tomato farm in North Queensland, Australia

With modern advancements, crops are being cultivated year round in countries all around the world. As water usage becomes a more pervasive global issue, irrigation practices for crops are being refined and becoming more sustainable. While several irrigation systems are used, these may be grouped into two types: high flow and low flow. These systems must be managed precisely to prevent runoff, overspray, or low-head drainage.

== Scarcity of water in agriculture ==
About 60 years ago, the common perception was that water was an infinite resource. At that time, fewer than half the current number of people were on the planet. Standard of living was not as high, so individuals consumed fewer calories, and ate less meat, so less water was needed to produce their food. They required a third of the volume of water presently taken from rivers. Today, the competition for water resources is much more intense, because nearly eight billion people are now on the planet, and their consumption of meat and vegetables is rising. Competition for water from industry, urbanisation, and biofuel crops is rising congruently. To avoid a global water crisis, farmers will have to make strides to increase productivity to meet growing demands for food, while industry and cities find ways to use water more efficiently.

Successful agriculture is dependent upon farmers having sufficient access to water, but water scarcity is already a critical constraint to farming in many parts of the world. Physical water scarcity is where not enough water is available to meet all demands, including that needed for ecosystems to function effectively. Arid regions frequently suffer from physical water scarcity. It also occurs where water seems abundant, but where resources are over-committed. This can happen where hydraulic infrastructure is over-developed, usually for irrigation. Symptoms of physical water scarcity include environmental degradation and declining groundwater. Economic scarcity, meanwhile, is caused by a lack of investment in water or insufficient human capacity to satisfy the demand for water. Symptoms of economic water scarcity include a lack of infrastructure, with people often having to fetch water from rivers for domestic and agricultural uses. Some 2.8 billion people currently live in water-scarce areas. In developed countries, environmental regulations restrict water availability by redirecting water to aid endangered species, such as snail darters.

Agricultural water as a share of total water withdrawals

Agricultural water withdrawals in 2010

== Sustainable water use ==
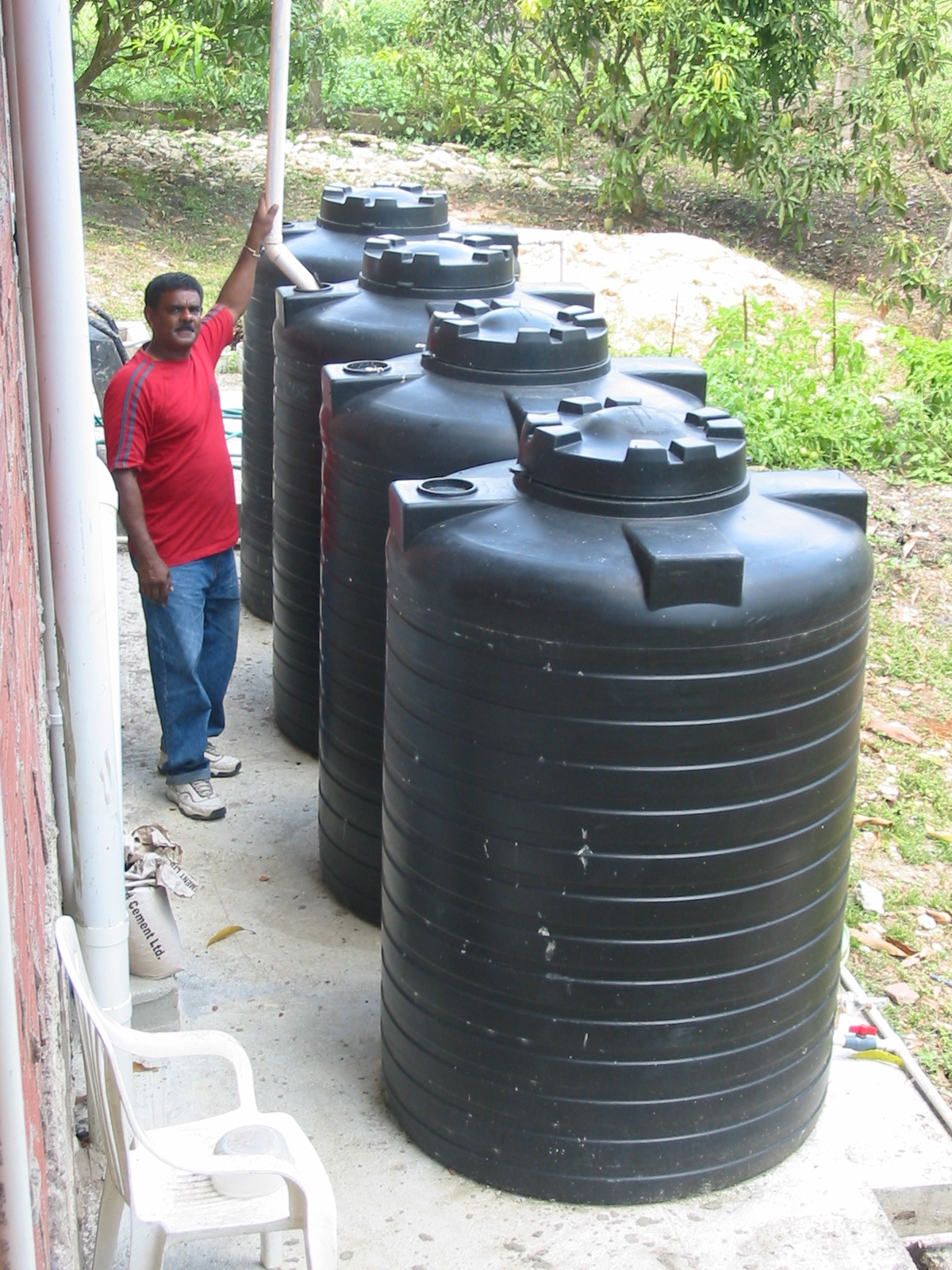
A rooftop rainwater harvesting system in Trinidad, 2003

While water use affects environmental degradation and economic growth, it is also sparking innovation regarding new irrigation methods. In 2006, the USDA predicted that if the agricultural sector improved water efficiency by just 10%, farms could save upwards of $200 million per year. Many of the practices that cut water use are cost effective. Farmers who use straw, compost, or mulch around their crops can reduce evaporation by about 75%, though the input costs are neither inexpensive nor readily available in some areas. This would also reduce the number of weeds and save a farmer from using herbicides. Mulches or ground covers also allow the soils to absorb more water by reducing compaction. The use of white or pale gravel is also practiced, as it reduces evaporation and keeps soil temperatures low by reflecting sunlight.

In addition to reducing water loss at the sink, more sustainable ways to harvest water also can be used. Many modern small (nonindustrial) farmers are using rain barrels to collect the water needed for their crops and livestock. On average, rainwater harvesting where rain is frequent reduces the cost of water in half. This would also greatly reduce the stress on local aquifers and wells. Because farmers use the roofs of their buildings to gather this water, this also reduced rainwater runoff and soil erosion on and around their farms.
