= Groundwater energy balance =

The groundwater energy balance is the energy balance of a groundwater body in terms of incoming hydraulic energy associated with groundwater inflow into the body, energy associated with the outflow, energy conversion into heat due to friction of flow, and the resulting change of energy status and groundwater level.

== Theory ==
When multiplying the horizontal velocity of groundwater (dimension, for example, $m^3/\text{day}$ per $m^2$ cross-sectional area) with the groundwater potential (dimension energy per volume of water, or $E/m^3$) one obtains an energy flow (flux) in $E/\text{day}$ for the given flow and cross-sectional area.

Summation or integration of the energy flux in a vertical cross-section of unit width (say 1m) from the lower flow boundary (the impermeable layer or base) up to the water table in an unconfined aquifer gives the energy flow $f_E$ through the cross-section in $E/\text{day}$ per m width of the aquifer.

While flowing, the groundwater loses energy due to friction of flow, i.e. hydraulic energy is converted into heat. At the same time, energy may be added with the recharge of water coming into the aquifer through the water table. Thus one can make a hydraulic energy balance of a block of soil between two nearby cross-sections. In steady state, i.e. without change in energy status and without accumulation or depletion of water stored in the soil body, the energy flow in the first section plus the energy added by groundwater recharge between the sections minus the energy flow in the second section must equal the energy loss due to friction of flow.

In mathematical terms this balance can be obtained by differentiating the cross-sectional integral of Fe in the direction of flow using the Leibniz rule, taking into account that the level of the water table may change in the direction of flow. The mathematics is simplified using the Dupuit–Forchheimer assumption.

The hydraulic friction losses can be described in analogy to Joule's law in electricity (see Joule's law#Hydraulic equivalent), where the friction losses are proportional to the square value of the current (flow) and the electrical resistance of the material through which the current occurs. In groundwater hydraulics (fluid dynamics, hydrodynamics) one often works with hydraulic conductivity (i.e. permeability of the soil for water), which is inversely proportional to the hydraulic resistance.

The resulting equation of the energy balance of groundwater flow can be used, for example, to calculate the shape of the water table between drains under specific aquifer conditions. For this a numerical solution can be used, taking small steps along the impermeable base. The drainage equation is to be solved by trial and error (iterations), because the hydraulic potential is taken with respect to a reference level taken as the level of the water table at the water divide midway between the drains. When calculating the shape of the water table, its level at the water divide is initially not known. Therefore, this level is to be assumed before the calculations on the shape of the water table can be started. According to the findings of the calculation procedure, the initial assumption is to be adjusted and the calculations are to be restarted until the level of the water table at the divide does not differ significantly from the assumed level.

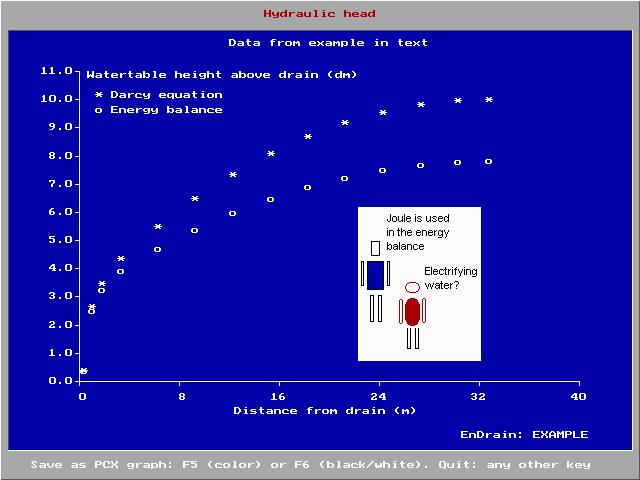
Shape of water table between drains

The trial and error procedure is cumbersome and therefore computer programs may be developed to aid in the calculations.

== Application ==
The energy balance of groundwater flow can be applied to flow of groundwater to subsurface drains. The computer program EnDrain compares the outcome of the traditional drain spacing equation, based on Darcy's law together with the continuity equation (i.e. conservation of mass), with the solution obtained by the energy balance and it can be seen that drain spacings are wider in the latter case. This is owing to the introduction of the energy supplied by the incoming recharge.

== See also ==
- DPHM-RS
- Drainage equation
- Groundwater discharge
- Groundwater flow equation
- Hydrogeology
