= Drainage system (agriculture) =

An agricultural drainage system is a system by which water is drained on or in the soil to enhance agricultural production of crops. It may involve any combination of stormwater control, erosion control, and watertable control.

== Classification ==
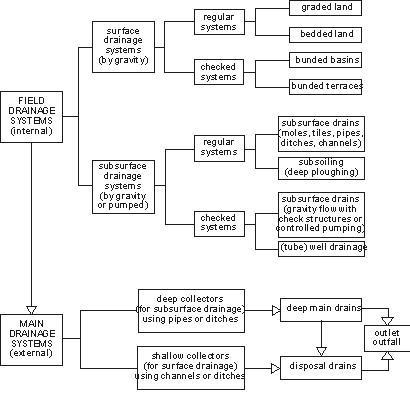
Classification of agricultural drainage systems.

While there are more than two types of drainage systems employed in agriculture, there are two main types: (1) surface drainage and (2) sub-surface drainage.

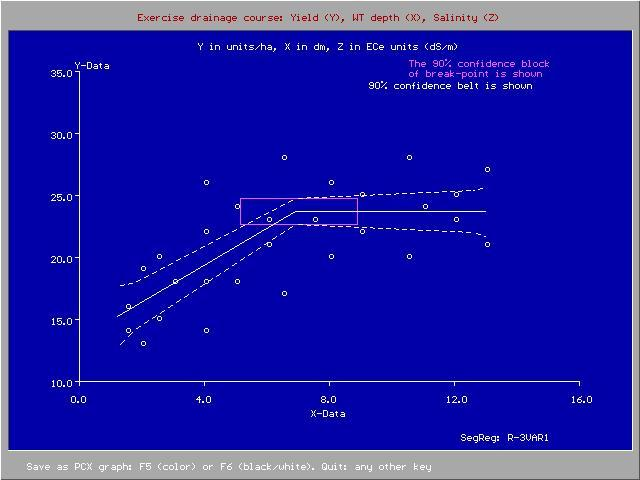
Crop yield (Y) and depth of water table (X in dm)

Figure 1 classifies the various types of drainage systems. It shows the field (or internal) and the main (or external) systems. The function of the field drainage system is to control the water table, whereas the function of the main drainage system is to collect, transport, and dispose of the water through an outfall or outlet. In some instances one makes an additional distinction between collector and main drainage systems. Field drainage systems are differentiated in surface and subsurface field drainage systems.

Sometimes (e.g., in irrigated, submerged rice fields), a form of temporary drainage is required whereby the drainage system is allowed to function only on certain occasions (e.g., during the harvest period). If allowed to function continuously, excessive quantities of water would be lost. Such a system is therefore called a checked, or controlled, drainage system.

More usually, however, drainage systems are meant to function as regularly as possible to prevent undue waterlogging at any given time and it is this regular drainage system that is most often employed. In agricultural literature, this is sometimes also called a "relief drainage system".

=== Surface drainage systems ===
The regular surface drainage systems, which start functioning as soon as there is an excess of rainfall or irrigation applied, operate entirely by gravity. They consist of reshaped or reformed land surfaces and can be divided into:

- Bedded systems, used in flat lands for crops other than rice;
- Graded systems, used in sloping land for crops other than rice.

The bedded and graded systems may have ridges and furrows.

The checked surface drainage systems consist of check gates placed in the embankments surrounding flat basins, such as those used for rice fields in flat lands. These fields are usually submerged and only need to be drained on certain occasions (e.g., at harvest time). Checked surface drainage systems are also found in terraced lands used for rice.

In literature, not much information can be found on the relations between the various regular surface field drainage systems, the reduction in the degree of waterlogging, and the agricultural or environmental effects. It is therefore difficult to develop sound agricultural criteria for the regular surface field drainage systems. Most of the known criteria for these systems concern the efficiency of the techniques of land leveling and earthmoving.

Similarly, agricultural criteria for checked surface drainage systems are not very well known.

=== Subsurface drainage systems ===
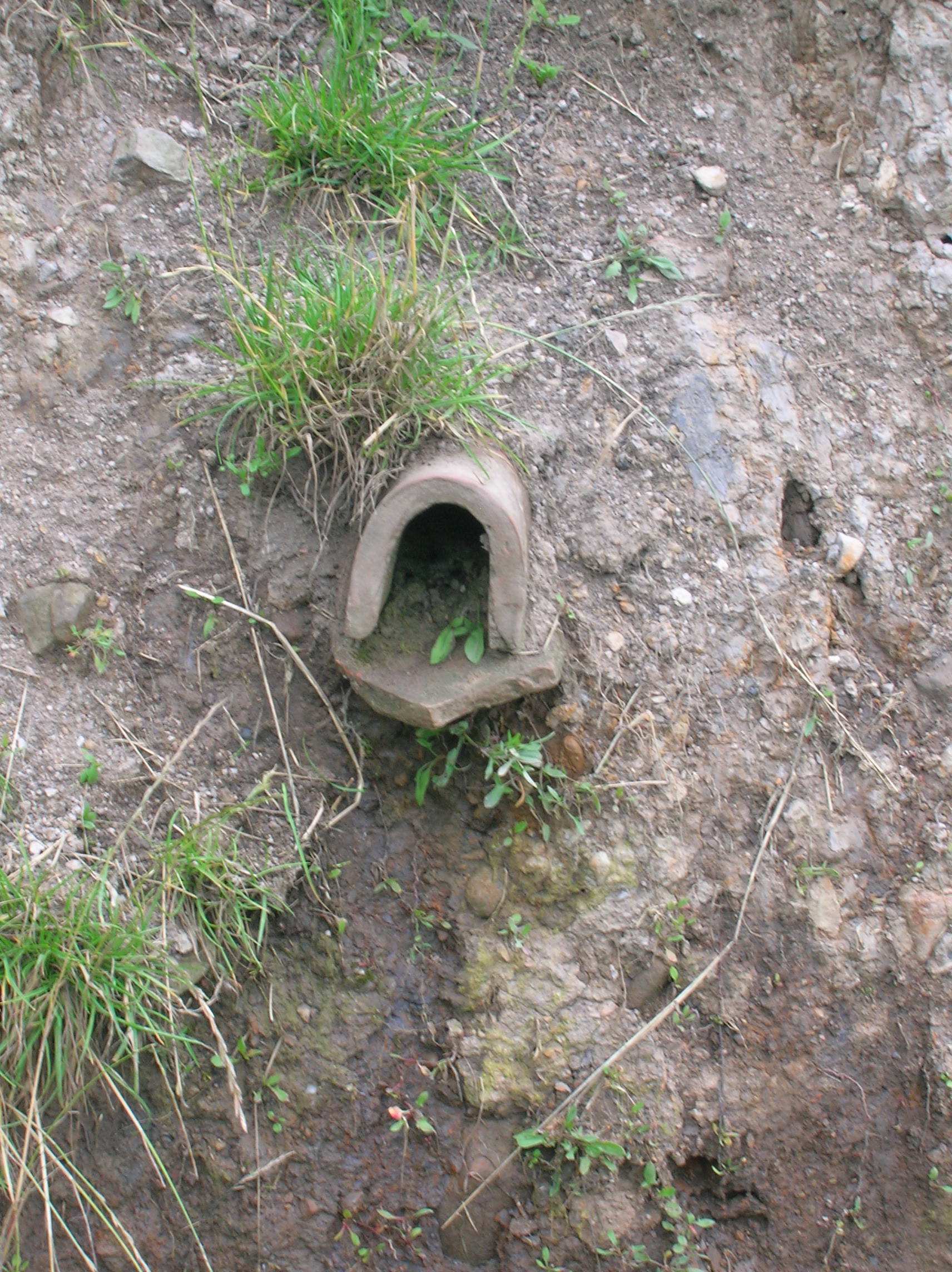
Mug and sole drain (Scotland, 18th century)

Like the surface field drainage systems, the subsurface field drainage systems can also be differentiated in regular systems and checked (controlled) systems.

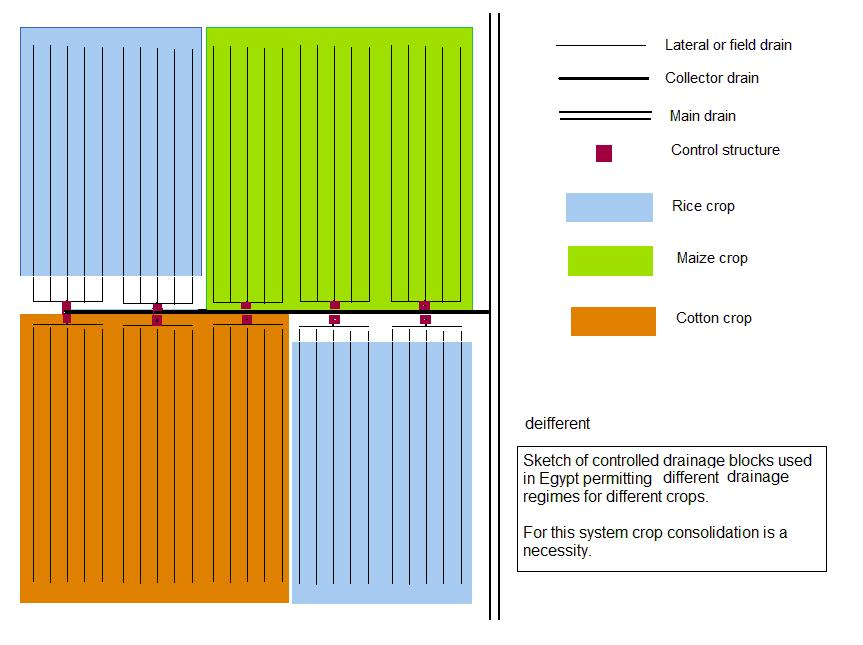
Controlled drainage system

When the drain discharge takes place entirely by gravity, both types of subsurface systems have much in common, except that the checked systems have control gates that can be opened and closed according to need. They can save much irrigation water. A checked drainage system also reduces the discharge through the main drainage system, thereby reducing construction costs.

When the discharge takes place by pumping, the drainage can be checked simply by not operating the pumps or by reducing the pumping time. In northwestern India, this practice has increased the irrigation efficiency and reduced the quantity of irrigation water needed, and has not led to any undue salinization.

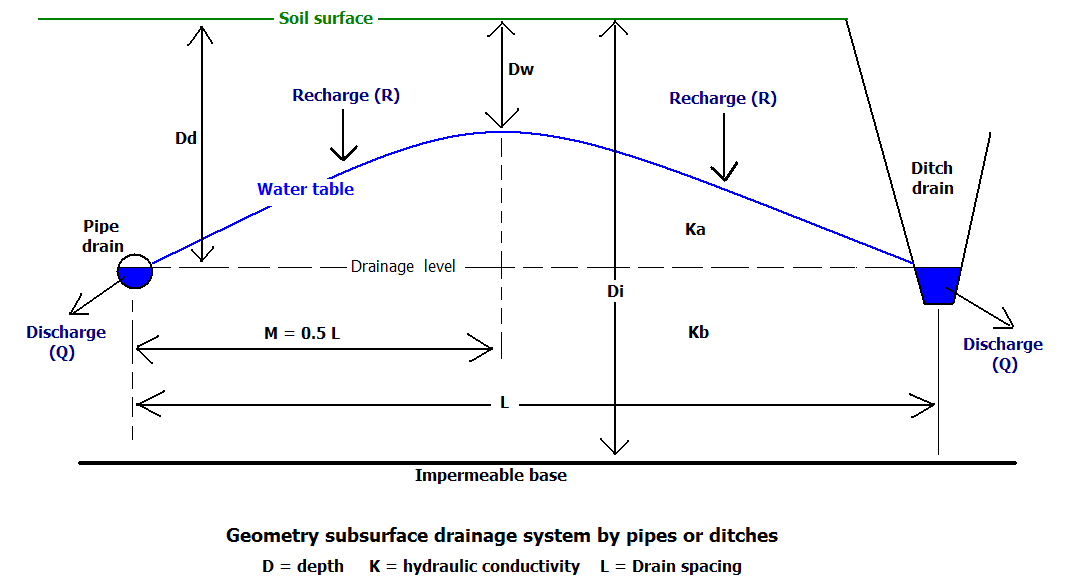
Parameters of horizontal drainage

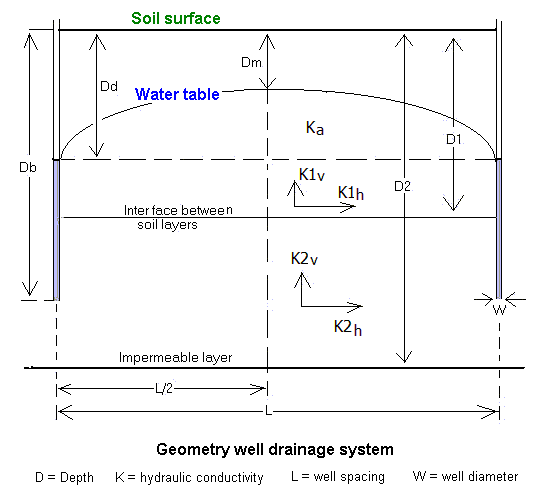
Parameters of vertical drainage

The subsurface field drainage systems consist of horizontal or slightly sloping channels made in the soil; they can be open ditches, trenches, filled with brushwood and a soil cap, filled with stones and a soil cap, buried pipe drains, tile drains, or mole drains, but they can also consist of a series of wells.

Modern buried pipe drains often consist of corrugated, flexible, and perforated plastic (PE or PVC) pipe lines wrapped with an envelope or filter material to improve the permeability around the pipes and to prevent entry of soil particles, which is especially important in fine sandy and silty soils. The surround may consist of synthetic fibre (geotextile).

The field drains (or laterals) discharge their water into the collector or main system either by gravity or by pumping.

The wells (which may be open dug wells or tubewells) have normally to be pumped, but sometimes they are connected to drains for discharge by gravity.

Subsurface drainage by wells is often referred to as vertical drainage, and drainage by channels as horizontal drainage, but it is more clear to speak of "field drainage by wells" and "field drainage by ditches or pipes" respectively.

In some instances, subsurface drainage can be achieved simply by breaking up slowly permeable soil layers by deep plowing (sub-soiling), provided that the underground has sufficient natural drainage. In other instances, a combination of sub-soiling and subsurface drains may solve the problem.

=== Main drainage systems ===
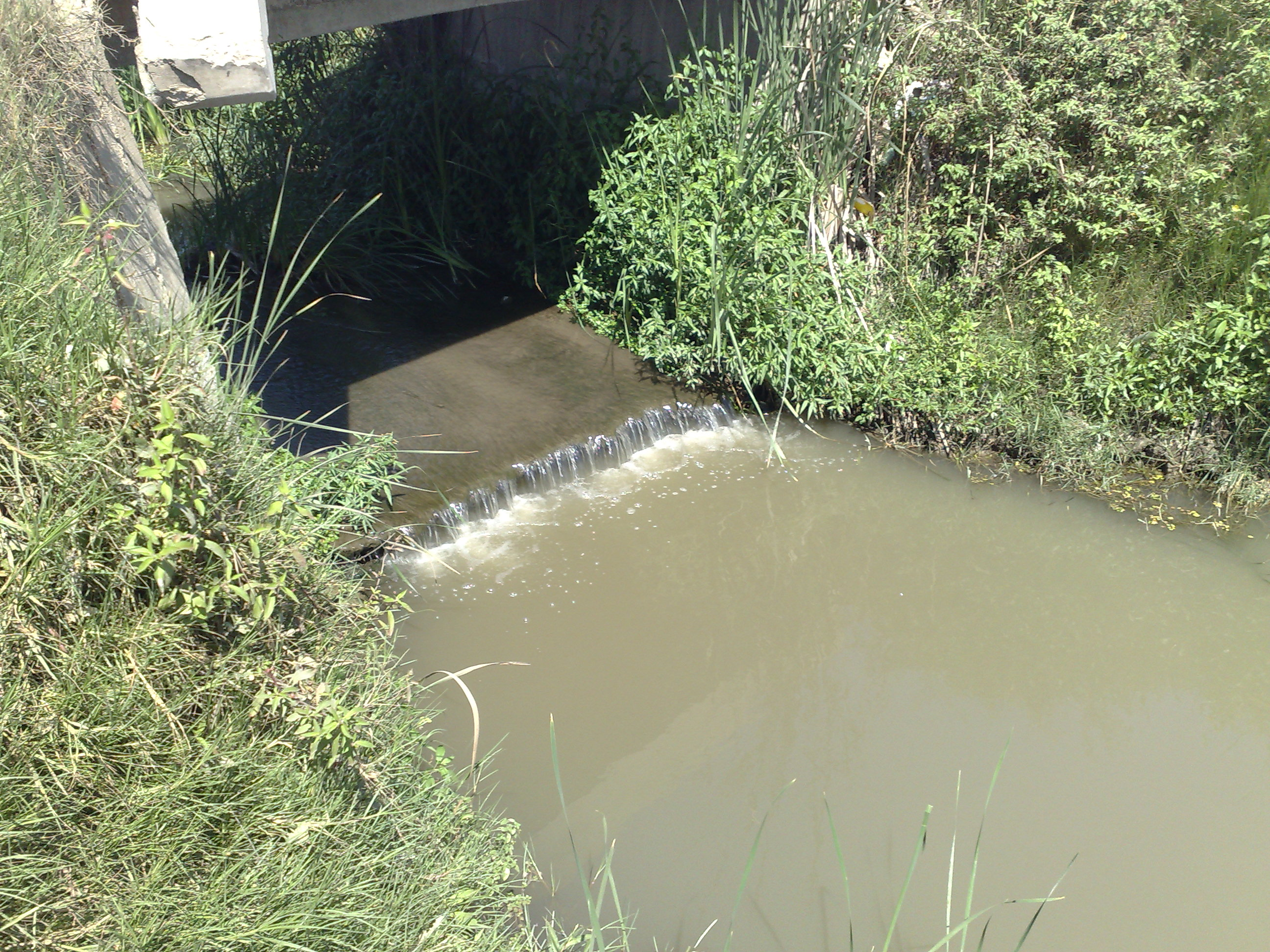
Deep collector drain

The main drainage systems consist of deep or shallow collectors, and main drains or disposal drains.

Deep collector drains are required for subsurface field drainage systems, whereas shallow collector drains are used for surface field drainage systems, but they can also be used for pumped subsurface systems. The deep collectors may consist of open ditches or buried pipe lines.

The terms deep collectors and shallow collectors refer rather to the depth of the water level in the collector below the soil surface than to the depth of the bottom of the collector. The bottom depth is determined both by the depth of the water level and by the required discharge capacity.

The deep collectors may either discharge their water into deep main drains (which are drains that do not receive water directly from field drains, but only from collectors), or their water may be pumped into a disposal drain.

Disposal drains are main drains in which the depth of the water level below the soil surface is not bound to a minimum, and the water level may even be above the soil surface, provided that embankments are made to prevent inundation. Disposal drains can serve both subsurface and surface field drainage systems.

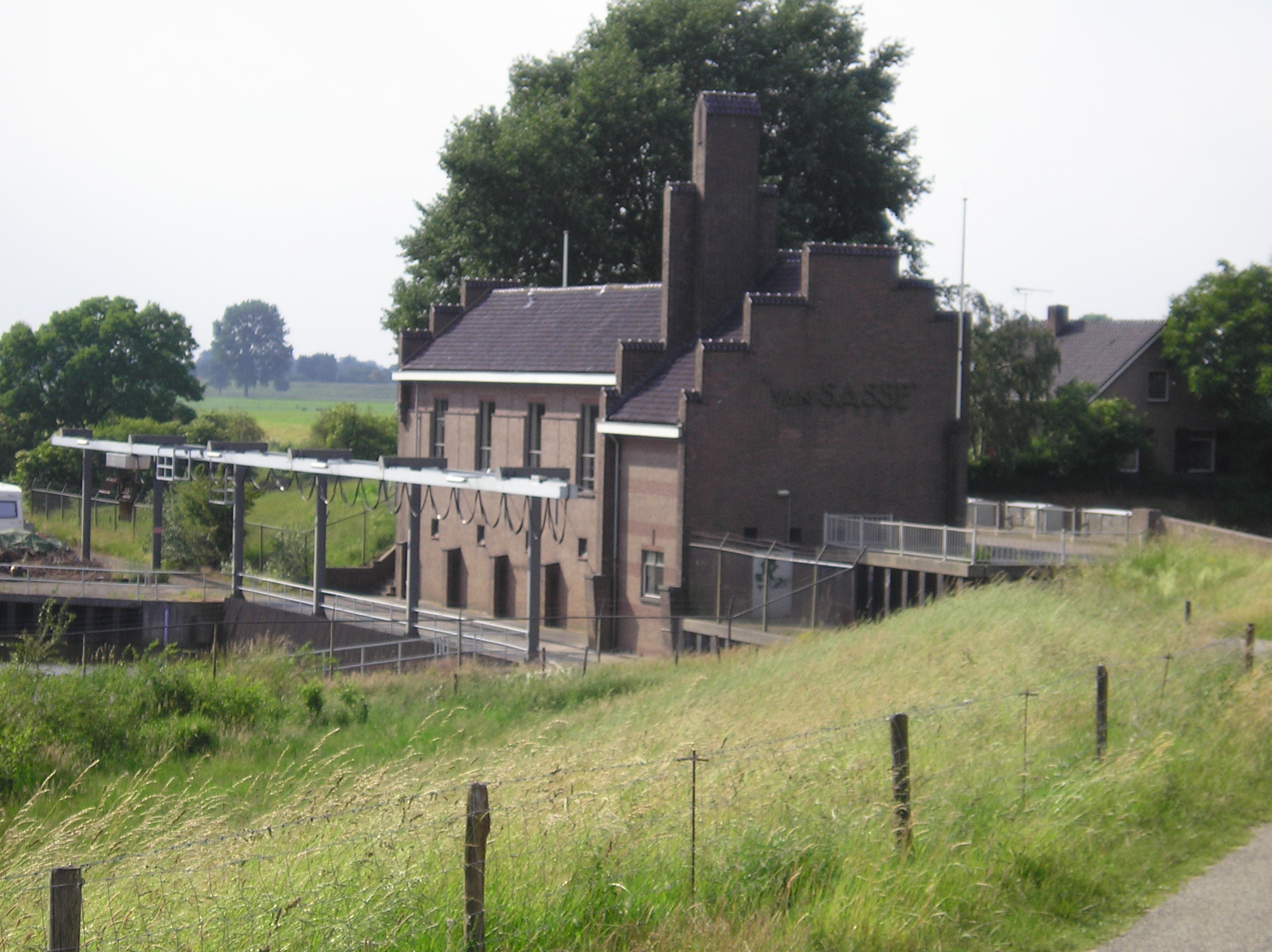
Pumping station Van Sasse in Grave, the Netherlands

Deep main drains can gradually become disposal drains if they are given a smaller gradient than the land slope along the drain.

The technical criteria applicable to main drainage systems depend on the hydrological situation and on the type of system.

=== Main drainage outlet ===
The final point of a main drainage system is the gravity outlet structure or the pumping station.

== Applications ==
Surface drainage systems are usually applied in relatively flat lands that have soils with a low or medium infiltration capacity, or in lands with high-intensity rainfalls that exceed the normal infiltration capacity, so that frequent waterlogging occurs on the soil surface.

Subsurface drainage systems are used when the drainage problem is mainly that of shallow water tables.

When both surface and subsurface waterlogging occur, a combined surface/subsurface drainage system is required.

Sometimes, a subsurface drainage system is installed in soils with a low infiltration capacity, where a surface drainage problem may improve the soil structure and the infiltration capacity so greatly that a surface drainage system is no longer required.

On the other hand, it can also happen that a surface drainage system diminishes the recharge of the groundwater to such an extent that the subsurface drainage problem is considerably reduced or even eliminated.

The choice between a subsurface drainage system by pipes and ditches or by tube wells is more a matter of technical criteria and costs than of agricultural criteria, because both types of systems can be designed to meet the same agricultural criteria and achieve the same benefits. Usually, pipe drains or ditches are preferable to wells. However, when the soil consists of a poorly permeable top layer several meters thick, overlying a rapidly permeable and deep subsoil, wells may be a better option, because the drain spacing required for pipes or ditches would be considerably smaller than the spacing for wells.

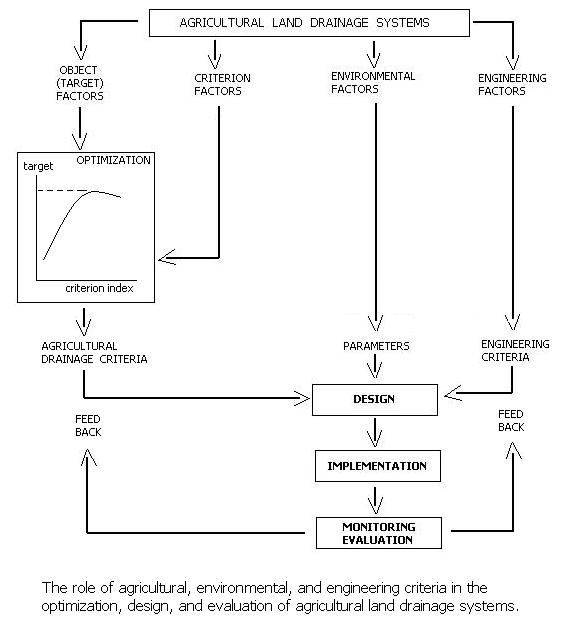
Drainage design procedures

When the land needs a subsurface drainage system, but saline groundwater is present at great depth, it is better to employ a shallow, closely spaced system of pipes or ditches instead of a deep, widely spaced system. The reason is that the deeper systems produce a more salty effluent than the shallow systems. Environmental criteria may then prohibit the use of the deeper systems.

In some drainage projects, one may find that only main drainage systems are envisaged. The agricultural land is then still likely to suffer from field drainage problems. In other cases, one may find that field drainage systems are ineffective because there is no adequate main drainage system. In either case, the installation of drainage systems is not recommended.

== Drainage system design ==
The analysis of positive and negative (side) effects of drainage and the optimization of drainage design in accordance to the drainage design procedures is discussed in the article on Drainage research.

== See also ==
- EnDrain
- Joseph Elkington
- National Irrigation Congress
