= Fault zone hydrogeology =

Study of how deformed rocks alter fluid flows

Fault zone hydrogeology is the study of how brittlely deformed rocks alter fluid flows in different lithological settings, such as clastic, igneous and carbonate rocks. Fluid movements, that can be quantified as permeability, can be facilitated or impeded due to the existence of a fault zone. This is because different mechanisms that deform rocks can alter porosity and permeability within a fault zone. Fluids involved in a fault system generally are groundwater (fresh and marine waters) and hydrocarbons (Oil and Gas).

Take notice that permeability (k) and hydraulic conductivity (K) are used interchangeably in this article for simplified understanding

GIF 1. This GIF shows how fault zones affect fluid migrations in the cross section view. A) The fault zone acts as a barrier that blocks fluid flows across it. B) The fault zone acts as a conduit that allows or facilitates fluid flows across it.

== Architecture ==
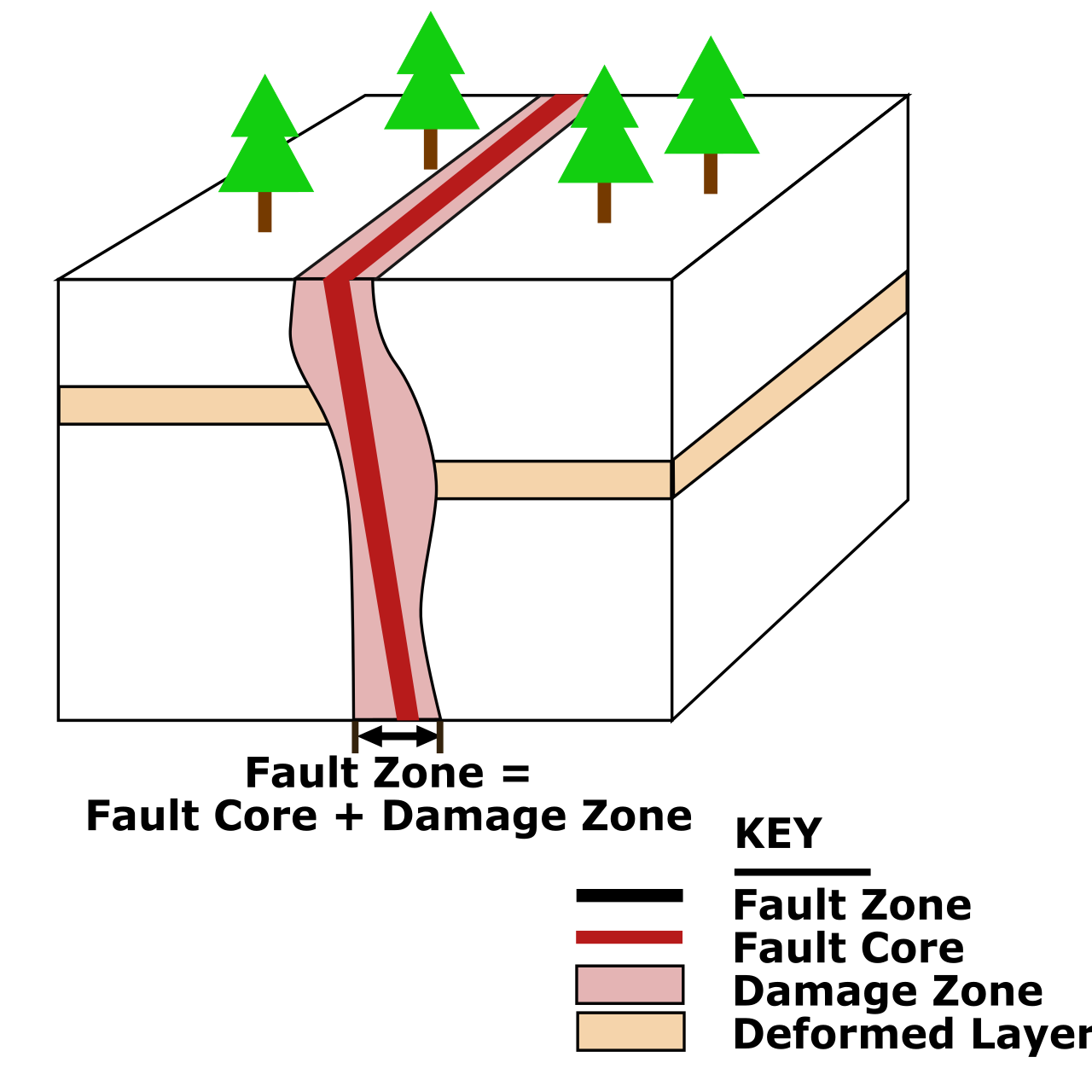
Figure 1. The figure shows the architecture of a fault zone, in which a fault core is enveloped by a damage zone.

A fault zone can be generally subdivided into two major sections, including a Fault Core (FC) and a Damage Zone (DZ) (Figure 1).

The fault core is surrounded by the damage zone. It has a measurable thickness which increases with fault throw and displacement, i.e. increasing deformations.

The damage zone envelopes the fault core irregularly in a 3D manner which can be meters to few hundred meters wide (perpendicular to the fault zone). Within a large fault system, multiple fault cores and damage zones can be found. Younger fault cores and damage zones can overlap the older ones.

Different processes can alter the permeability of the fault zone in the fault core and the damage zone will be discussed respectively in the next section. In general, the permeability of a damage zone is several orders of magnitude higher than that of a fault core as damage zones typically act as conduits (will be discussed in section 3). Within a damage zone, permeability decreases further away from a fault core.

== Permeability classification ==
There are many classifications to group fault zones based on their permeability patterns. Some terms are interchangeable; while some have different subgroups. Most of expressions are listed in the following table for comparison. Dickerson's categorisation is commonly used and easier to understand in a broad range of studies.

The classification of a fault zone can change spatially and temporally. The fault core and damage zone can behave differently to accommodate the deformations. Moreover, the fault zone can be dynamic through time. Thus, the permeability patterns can change for short-term and long-term effects.

Table 1 Common Permeability Classification of Fault Zone
Authors / Definitions	K_{fz} < K_{hr}	K_{fz} < K_{hr} and K_{fz} > K_{hr}	Dynamic System	K_{fz} > K_{hr}
Dickerson's (2000)	Barriers	Barrier-Conduit	/	Conduit
Aydin's (2000)	Transmitting	Vertically Transmitting and Lateral Sealing	Transmitting or Lateral Intermittently	Sealing
Caine & Foster's (1999)	Quantitative mapping and discrete fracture models			
Others	Detailed description (Weak/ Strong); Barrier/ Conduit Permeability Ratio			

*K = Permeability/ Hydraulic Conductivity

*fz = fault zone

*hr = host rock = Undeformed rock surrounds the fault zones

== Mechanisms (permeability) ==
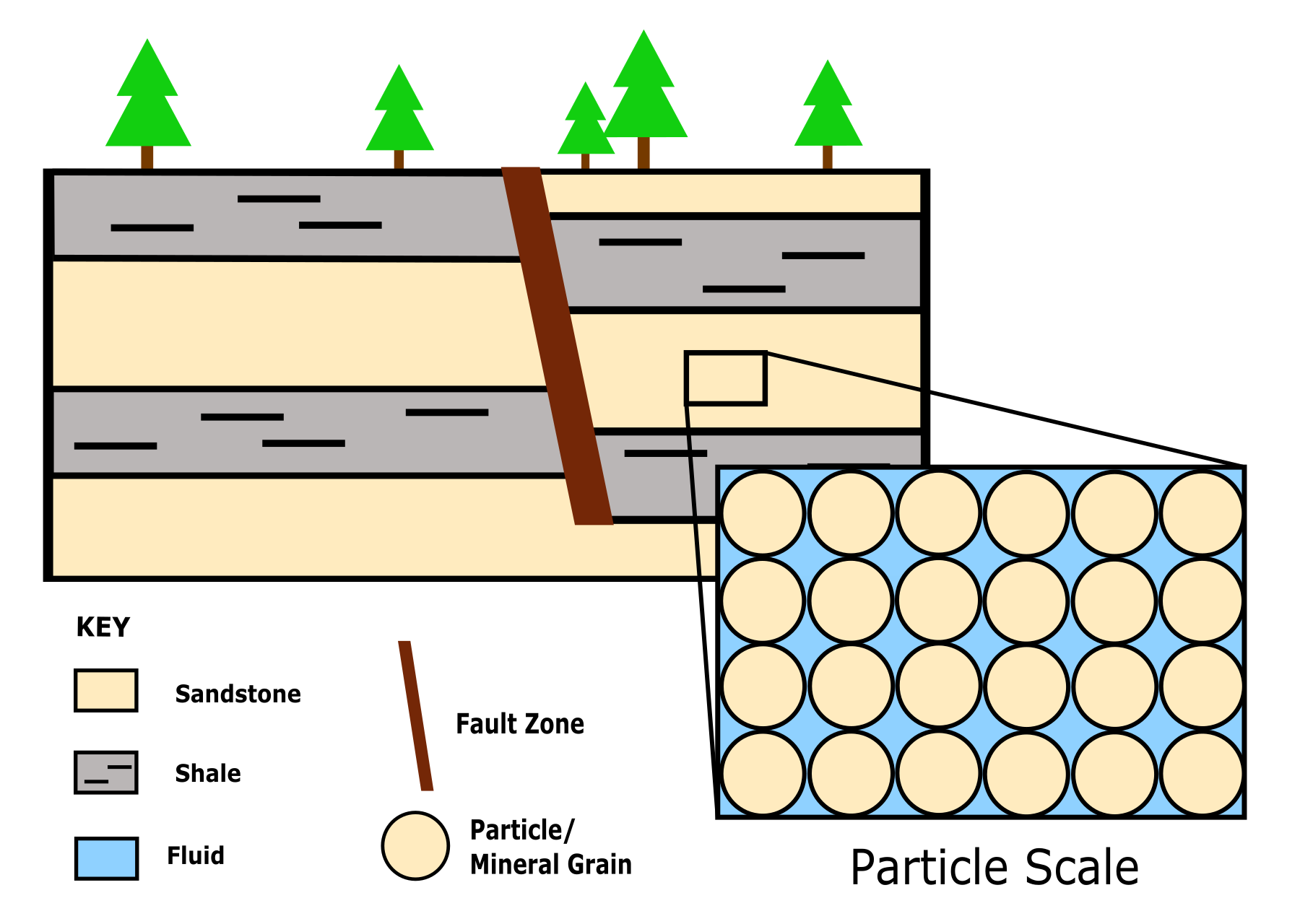
Figure 2. The figure shows a cross-section that consists of a fault zone cutting through the sandstone and shale layers. A zoom-in box illustrates the sand-sized grains within the sandstones.

Fault zone results from brittle deformation. Numerous mechanisms can vary the permeability of a fault zone. Some processes affect the permeability temporarily. These processes enhance the permeability for a certain period, and then reduce it later on: in this case, like seismic events, the permeability is not constant through time. Physical and chemical reactions are the major types of mechanisms. Different mechanisms can occur different in fault core and damage zone since the intensities of deformation they experience are different (Table 3).

Table 2 Occurrences in Fault Core and Damage Zone
Mechanisms	Deformation Bands	Brecciation	Fracturing	Sediment Mixing	Clay Smears	Cataclasis	Compaction	Dissolution	Precipitation	Seismic Event
Fault Core	+	+	+	+	+	+	+	+		+
Damage Zone			+		+		+		+	

*+ = more likely to occur at

=== Enhancing fault zone permeability ===
==== Deformation bands ====
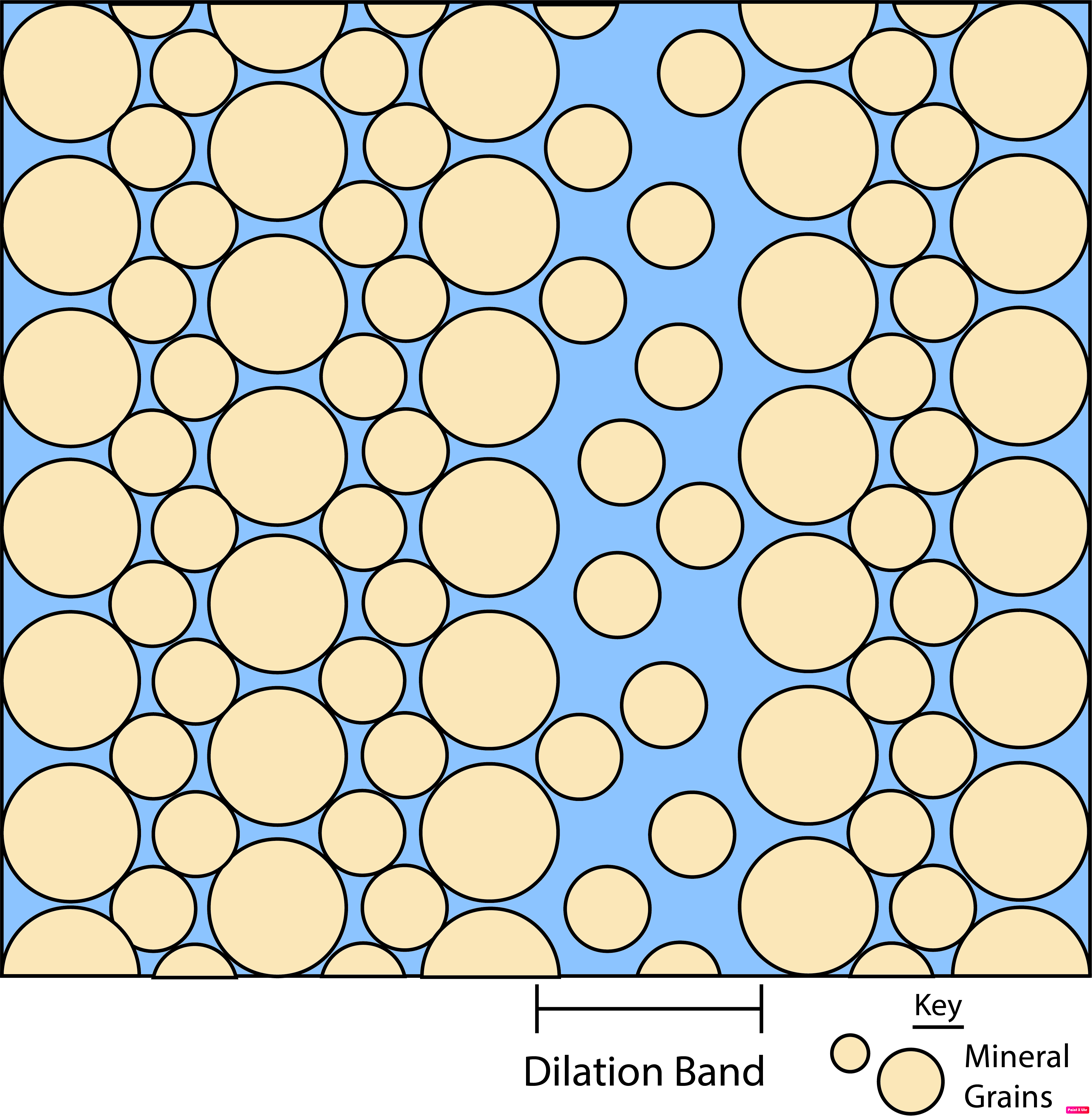
Figure 3. The figure shows a dilation band. Its formation does not involve grain movements and it can facilitate fluid movements.

The formation of a dilation band, in unconsolidated material, is the early result of applying extensional forces. Disaggregation of mineral fabric occurs along with the band, yet no offset is accommodated by the movement of grains (Figure 3).

Figure 4. This shows how a shear band facilitates fluid movements by rotation and sliding.

Further deformation causes offsets of mineral grains by rotation and sliding. This is called a shear band. The pore network is rearranged by granular movements (also called particulate flow), hence moderately enhance permeability. However, continuing deformation leads to the cataclasis of mineral grains which will further reduce permeability later on (section 3.2.3) (Figure 4).

==== Brecciation ====
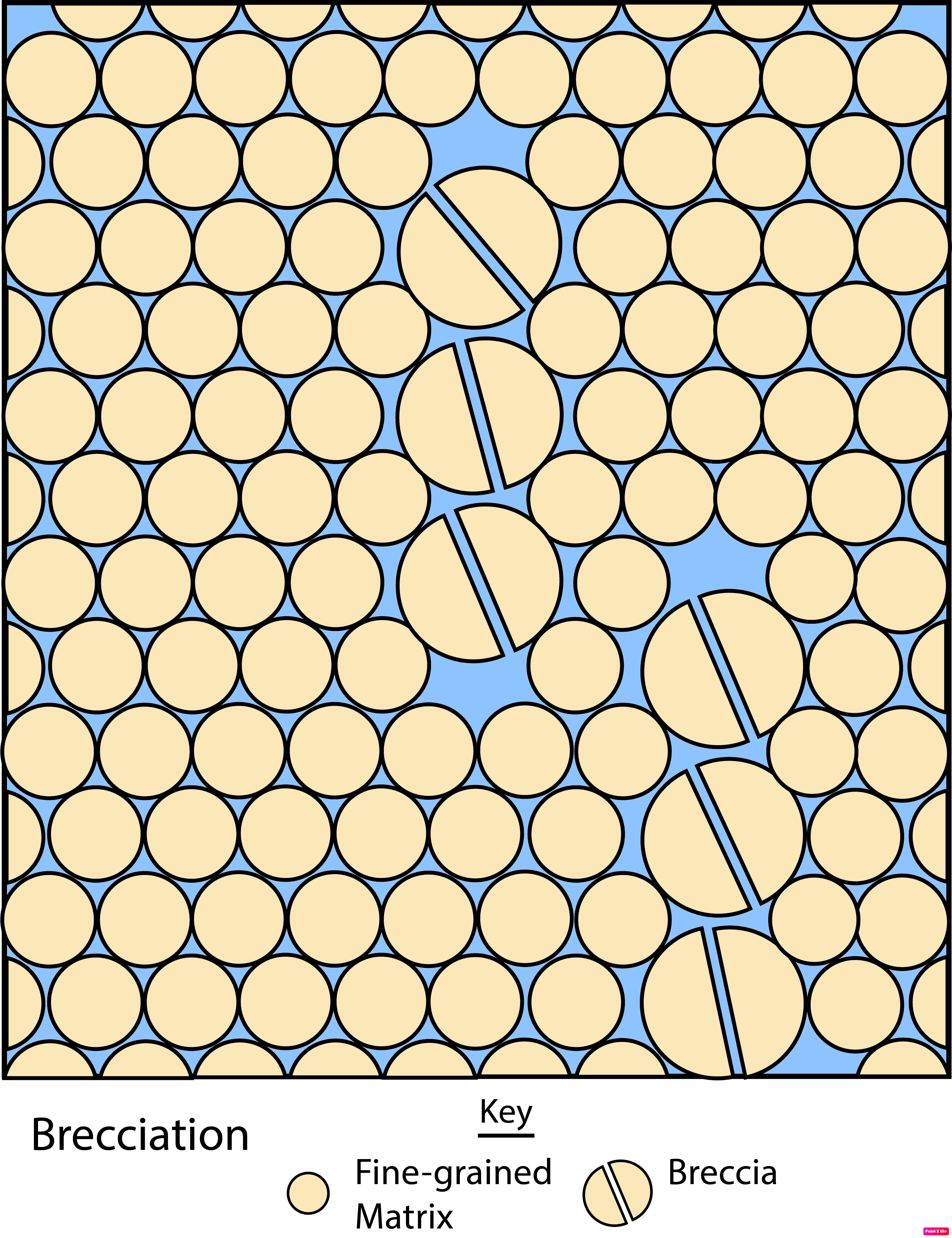
Figure 5. This shows the brecciation of rocks, thus, enhancing permeability by opening new paths.

Brecciation refers to the formation of angular, coarse-grained fragments embedded in a fine-grained matrix. As breccia (the rock experienced brecciation) is often non-cohesive, thus, permeability can be increased up to four or five orders of magnitude. However, the void space enlarged by brecciation will lead to further displacement along the fault zone by cementation, resulting in a strong permeability reduction (Figure 5).

==== Fracturing ====
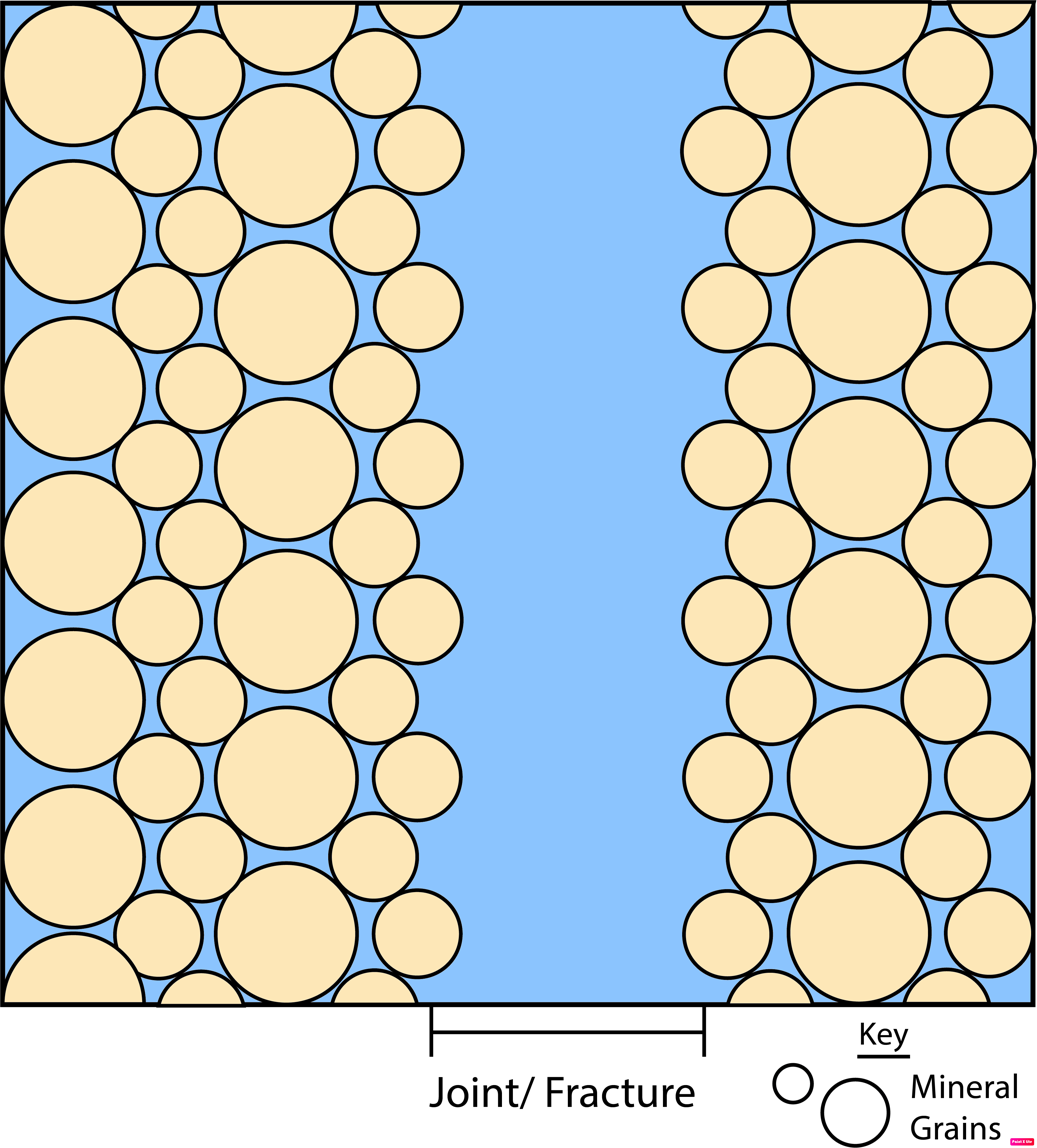
Figure 6. The figure shows the formation of a fracture, providing a relatively large aperture for fluid flow.

Fractures propagate along a fault zone in direction responding to the stress applied. The enhancement of permeability is controlled by the density, orientation, length distribution, aperture, and connectivity of fractures. Even fracture with aperture of a 100-250 μm can still greatly influence fluid movement (Figure 6).

=== Reducing fault zone permeability ===
==== Sediment mixing ====
Sediments, typically from distinct formations, with different grain sizes, are mixed physically by deformation, resulting in a more poorly-sorted mixture. The pore space is filled by smaller grains, increasing tortuosity (mineral scale in this case) of fluid flow across the fault system.

==== Clay smears ====
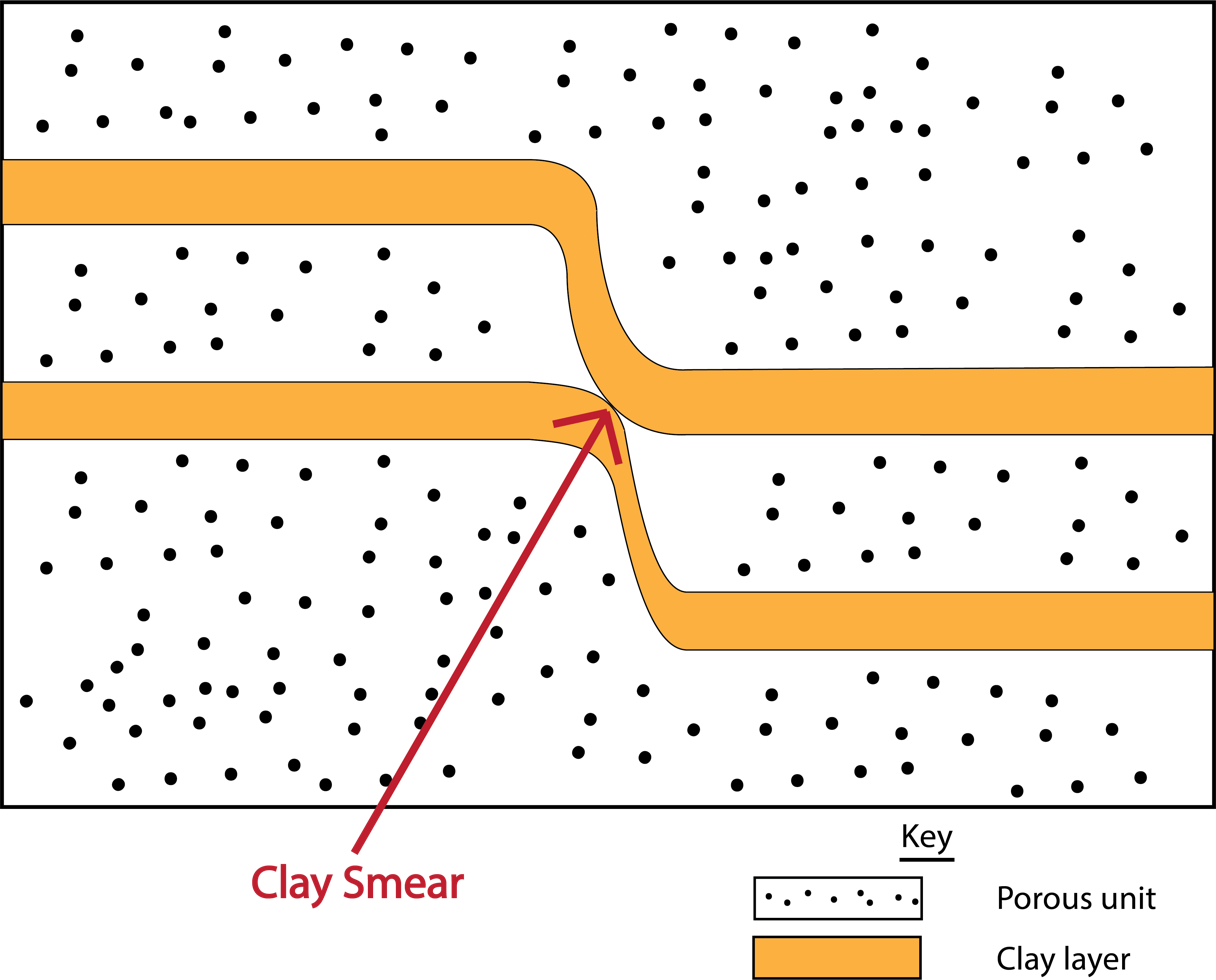
Figure 7. The figure shows clay smears formed by deformation within a fault zone, providing a sealing effect for fluids.

Clay minerals are phyllo-silicate, in other words, with sheet-like structure. They are effective agents that block fluid flows across a fault zone. Clay smears, deformed layers of clay, that are developed along fault zone can act as a seal of hydrocarbon reservoir i.e. extremely low permeability that nearly prohibits all fluid flows (Figure 7).

==== Cataclasis ====
Cataclasis refers to pervasive brittle fracturing and comminution of grains. This mechanism becomes dominant at depth, greater than 1 km, and with larger grains. With increasing intensity of cataclasis, fault gouge, often with the presence of clay, is formed. The largest reduction occurs on the flows that are perpendicular to the band.

=== Enhancing and reducing fault zone permeability successively ===
==== Compaction and cementation ====
Compactions and cementation generally lead to permeability reduction by losing porosity. When a large region, which consist a fault zone, experience compaction and cementation, porosity loss in host rock (undeformed rock surrounding the fault zone) can be greater than that of fault zone rock. Hence, fluids are forced to flow through a fault zone.

==== Dissolution and precipitation ====
Solute carried by fluids can either enhance or reduce permeability by dissolution or precipitation (cementation). Which process takes place depends on geochemical conditions like rock composition, solute concentration, temperature, and so on. The changes in porosity dominantly control whether the fluid-rock interaction continues or slows down as a strong feedback reaction.

For example, minerals like carbonates, quartz, and feldspars are dissolved by the fluid-rock interactions due to enhanced permeability. Further introduction of fluids can either continuously dissolve or otherwise re-precipitate minerals in the fault core, and thus alters the permeability. Therefore, whether the feedback is positive or negative heavily depends on the geochemical conditions.

==== Seismic event ====
Earthquakes can either increase or decrease permeability along fault zones, depending on the hydrogeological settings. Recorded hot spring discharges show seismic waves dominantly enhance permeability, but reductions in discharge may also result occasionally. The timescale of the changes can be up to thousands of years. Hydraulic fracturing (fracking) requires increasing the interconnectedness of the pore space (in other words, permeability) of shale to allow the gas to flow through the rock, and very small deliberately induced seismic activity of magnitudes smaller than 1 are applied to enhance rock permeability.

Taking the Chile earthquake in 2017 as an example, the discharge of streamflow temporally increased six times indicates a sixfold enhancement in permeability along the fault zone. Yet, seismic-induced effects are temporary that normally last for months, for Chile's case, it lasted for one and a half months which gradually decreased back to original discharge.

Table 3 Fault Zone Permeability Changes
Mechanisms	Dilation	Shear Bands	Brecciation	Fracturing	Sediment Mixing	Clay Smears	Cataclasis (with low presence of clay)
Changes in Order(s) of Magnitude (compared to no fault zone)	1	< 1	4 ~ 5	2 ~ 3	2	Act as a seal	1 ~ - 3; (- 4 ~ - 5)

== Mechanisms (porosity) ==
Porosity (φ) directly reflects the specific storage of rock. And brittle formation alters the pores by different mechanisms. If the pores are deformed and connected together, the permeability of rock enhances. On the other hand, if the deformed pores disconnect with each other, the permeability of rock in this case reduces.

=== Pore types ===
Table 4 Four Major Pore Types (that are related to fault zone)
Pore types	Illustrations	Mechanisms	Descriptions
Intergranular pores	Intφ refers to intergranular pores. Image under petrographic microscope is extracted from Farrel & Healy, 2017.	Compaction Cementation	Intergranular pores are the voids formed during incomplete cementation. The pore spaces are not occupied by grains. The main feature of intergranular pores is that they are irregular in shape.
Grain dissolution pores	Disφ refers to grain dissolution pores. Image under petrographic microscope is extracted from Farrel & Healy, 2017.	Dissolution	Grain dissolution pores are formed when minerals are dissolved out. The pores are left as evidence of pre-existing mineral grains. The minerals usually are feldspars, calcites and so on.
Intragranular fracture pores	Ftφ refers to Intragranular fracture pores. Image under petrographic microscope is extracted from Farrel & Healy, 2017.	Fracturing Brecciation Cataclasis ????	Intragranular fracture pores are the voids created within a mineral grain. The fracture can cut through a grain into two grains.
Transgranular fracture pores	T-Ftφ refers to Transgranular fracture pores. Image under petrographic microscope is extracted from Farrel & Healy, 2017.	Fracturing Brecciation Cataclasis	Transgranular fracture pores are the cracks that cut through more than one mineral grain.

=== Enhancing porosity ===
==== Dissolution ====
The mineral grains can be dissolved when there is fluid flow. The spaces originally occupied by the minerals will be spare as voids, increasing the porosity of rock. The minerals that are usually dissolved are feldspar, calcite and quartz. Grain dissolution pores results from this process can enhance porosity.

=== Reducing porosity ===
==== Cataclasis, fracturing and brecciation ====
The mineral grains are broken up into smaller pieces by faulting event. Those smaller fragments will re-organise and further be compacted to form smaller pore spaces. These processes create intragranular fracture pores and transgranular fracture pores.

Important to be aware is that reducing porosity does not equal to reduction in permeability. Fracturing, bracciation and initial stage of cataclasis can connect pore spaces by cracks and dilation bands, increasing permeability.

==== Precipitation ====
The mineral grains can be precipitated when there is fluid flow. The voids in the rocks can be occupied by precipitation of mineral grains. The minerals fill the voids and hence, reducing the porosity. Overgrowth, precipitation around an existing mineral grain, of quartz are common. And overgrown minerals infill pre-existing pores, reducing porosity.

==== Clay deposition ====
Clay minerals are phyllo-silicate, in other words, with sheet-like structure. They are effective agents that block fluid flows. Kaolinite which is altered from potassium feldspar with the presence of water is a common mineral that fills pore spaces. Precipitation and infiltration only affect materials on shallow depth, hence, more clay materials infill pore spaces when they are closer to the surface. Yet, development of a fault zone introduces fluid to flow deeper. Thus, this facilitates clay deposition at depth, reducing porosity.

== Lithological effects ==
Lithology has a dominant effect on controlling which mechanisms would take place along a fault zone, hence, changing the porosity and permeability.

Table 5 Prominent Lithological Effects on Fault Zone Permeability
Mechanism / Lithology	Clastic Rocks	Igneous Rocks	Carbonate Rocks
Deformation Bands	↑		
Brecciations	↑		
Fracturing	↑	↑	↑
Sediment Mixing	↓		
Shale Formation	↓		
Clay Smears	↓		
Cataclasis	↓	↓	
Compaction & cementation	↓		↓
Dissolution			↑
Precipitation			↓
Seismic Events		↑	

*↑ = mechanism that enhance permeability

*↓ = mechanism that reduce permeability

== Fault type effects ==
All faults can be classified into three types. They are normal fault, reverse fault (thrust fault) and strike-slip fault. These different faulting behaviours accommodate the displacement in distinct structural ways.

The differences in faulting motions might favour or disfavour certain permeability altering mechanisms to occur. However, the main controlling factor of the permeability is the rock type. Since the characteristics of rock control how a fault zone can be developed and how fluids can move. For instance, sandstone generally has a higher porosity than that of shale. A deformed sandstone in three different faulting systems should have a higher specific storage, hence permeability, than that of shale. Similar example like the strength (resistance to deform) also significantly depends on rock types instead of fault types. Thus, the geological features of rock involved in a fault zone is a more dominated factor.

On the other hand, the type of fault might not be a dominant factor but the intensity of deformation is. The higher intensity of stresses applied to the rock, the more intense the rock will be deformed. The rock will experience a greater permeability changing event. Thus, the amount of stress applied matters.

Equally important is that identifying the permeability category of the fault zones (barriers, barrier-conduits and conduits) is the main scope of study. In other words, how the fault zones behave when there are fluids pass through.

== Studying approaches and methods ==
=== Surface and subsurface test ===
The studies of fault zones are recognised in the discipline of Structural Geology as it involves how rocks were deformed; while investigations of fluid movements are grouped in the field of Hydrology. There are mainly two types of methods used to examine the fault zone by structural geologists and hydrologists (Figure 7).

Table 6 Comparisons between Two Major Methods
Methods	Techniques	Advantages	Limitations
In Situ/ Subsurface-focused test (Hydrologists)	Boreholes; Drill holes; Tunnel Projects	Can study over a vast region; Hydraulic properties at depth can be obtained	Expensive and inefficient to study in a small-scaled region; Limited lithological and structural information; Cannot discover the existence of a fault zone at once
Outcrop Mapping/ Surface-focused test (Structural Geologist)	Outcrop Mappings; Shallow Probe Holes; Trial Pits	Details of fault zone architectures; Less expensive	Uncertainties resulted from predictions for rocks at depth; Cannot be conducted over a vast region

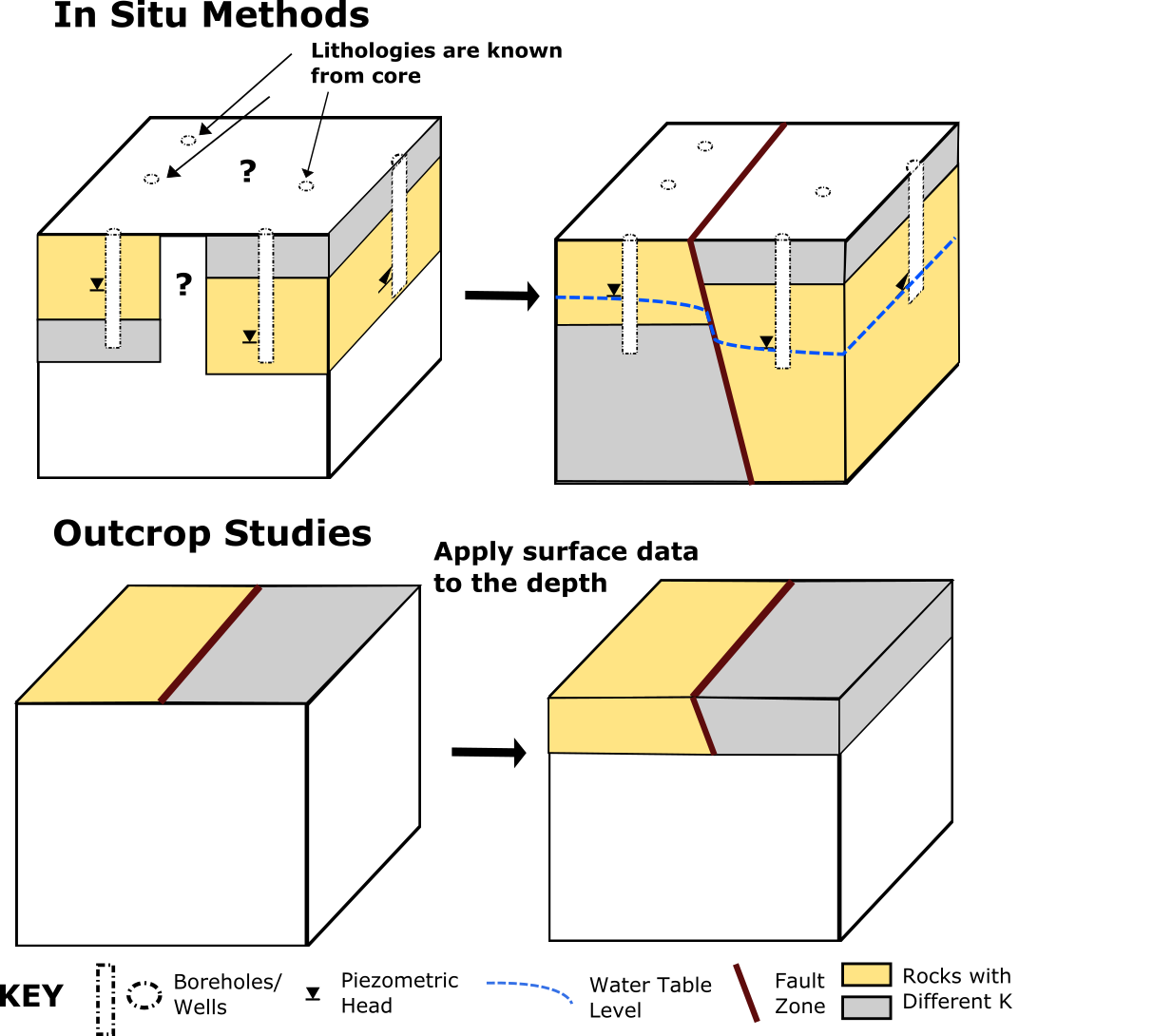
Figure 8. The schematic diagram shows the approach differences used between Hydrologist and Structural Geologist i.e. subsurface vs surface methods.

In situ test includes obtaining data from boreholes, drill cores, and tunnel projects. Normally the existence of a fault zone is found as different hydraulic properties are measured across it as fault zones are rarely drilled through (except for tunnel projects) (Figure 8).

The hydraulic properties of rocks are either obtained directly from outcrop samples or shallow probe holes/ trial pits, then the predictions of fault structure are made for the rocks at depth (Figure 8).

==== Example of a subsurface test ====
An example of a large-scale aquifer test conducted by Hadley (2020), the author used 5 wells aligned perpendicular to the Sandwich Fault Zone in the US, and the drawdowns as well as the recovery rates of water levels in every well were observed. From the evidence that the recovery rates are slower for the wells closer to the fault zone, it is suggested that the fault zone acts as a barrier for northward groundwater movement, affecting freshwater supply in the north.

==== Example of a surface test ====
From an outcrop study of the Zuccale Fault in Italy by Musumeci (2015), the surface outcrop findings and cross-cutting relationship are used to determine the number and mechanism of deformational events happened in the region. Moreover, the presences of breccias and cataclasites, that formed under brittle deformation, suggest that there was an initial stage of permeability increase, promoting an influx of CO_{2}-rich hydrous fluids. The fluids triggered low-grade metamorphism and dissolution-and-precipitation (i.e. pressure-solution) in mineral scale that shaped a foliated fault core, hence, enhancing the sealing effect significantly.

=== Other methods ===
==== Geophysics ====
Underground fluids, particularly groundwater, create anomalies for superconducting gravity data which help study the fault zone at depth. The method combines gravitational data and groundwater conditions to determine not only the permeability of a fault zone but also whether the fault zone is active or not.

==== Geochemistry ====
The geochemistry conditions of mineral fluids, water or gases, can be used to determine the existence of a fault zone by comparing the geochemistry of fluids' source, given that the conditions of aquifers are known. The fluids can be categorized by the concentrations of common solutes like total dissolved solids (TDS), Mg-Ca-Na/K phase, SO4-HCO3-Cl phase, and other dissolved trace elements.

=== Existing biases ===
The selection of an appropriate studying approach(es) is essential as there are biases existed when determining the fault zone permeability structure.

In crystalline rocks, the subsurface-focused investigations favor the discoveries of a conduit fault zone pattern; while the surface methods favor a combined barrier-conduit fault zone structure. The same biases, to a lesser extend, exist in sedimentary rock as well.

The biases can be related to the differences in studying scale. For structural geologists, it is very difficult to conduct outcrop study over a vast region; likewise, for hydrologists, it is expensive and ineffective to shorten borehole intervals for testing.

== Economic geology ==
It is economically worth studying the complex system, especially for arid/ semi-arid regions, where freshwater resources are limited, and potential areas with hydrocarbon storages. Further research on the fault zone, the result of deformation, gave insights on the interactions between earthquakes and hydrothermal fluids along fault zone. Moreover, hydrothermal fluids associated with the fault zone also provide information on how ore deposits accumulated.

=== Artificial hydrocarbon reservoirs ===
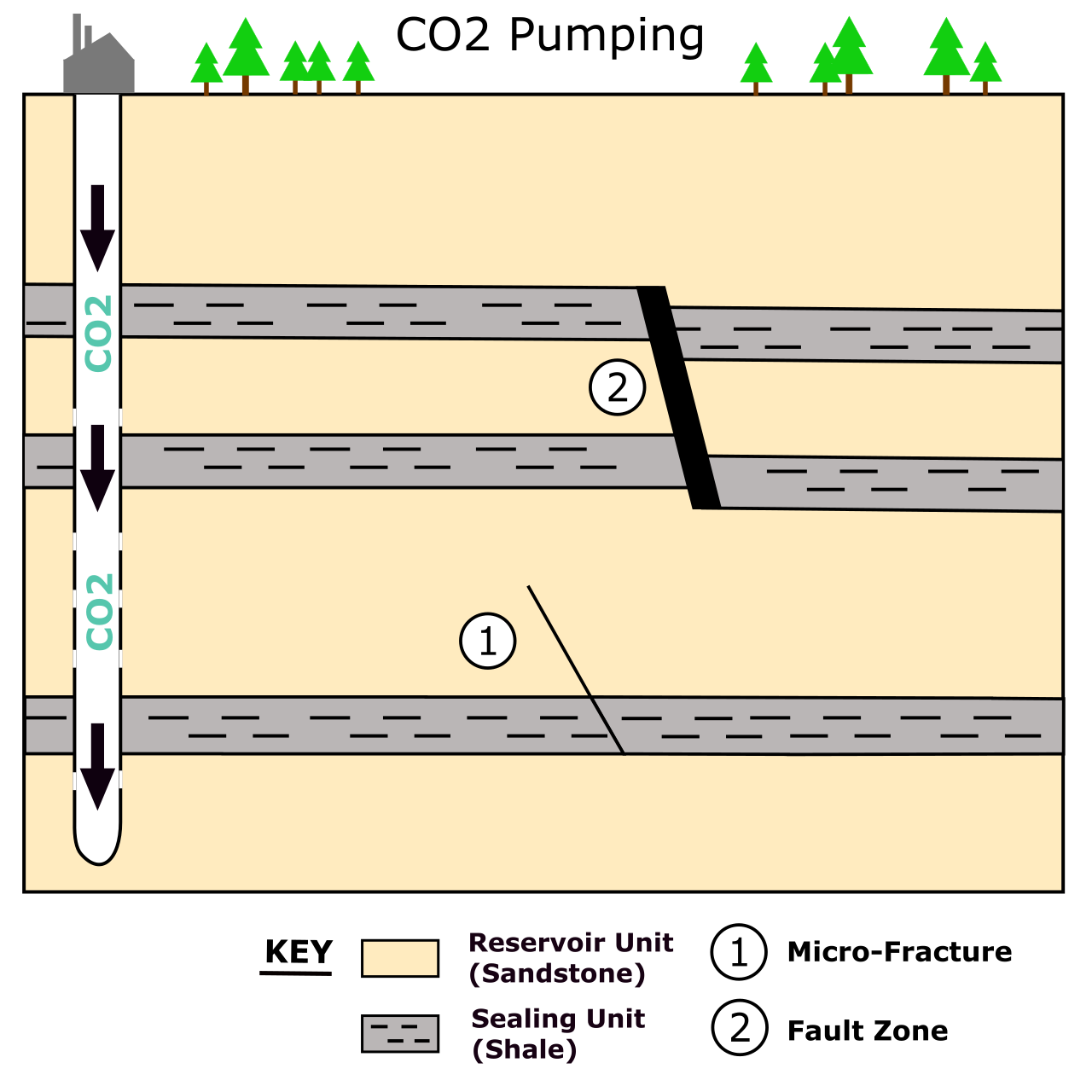
Figure 9. This shows the injection of atmospheric carbon by well, encountering a micro-fracture and a fault zone at depth.

Carbon sequestration is a modern method dealing with atmospheric carbon. One of the methods is pumping atmospheric carbon to specific depleted oil and gas reservoirs at depth. However, the presence of a fault zone act as either a seal or a conduit, affecting the efficiency of hydrocarbon formation.

Micro-fractures that cut along the sealing unit and the reservoir rock can greatly affect the hydrocarbon migration. The deformation band blocks the lateral (horizontal) flow of CO_{2} and the sealing unit keeps the CO_{2} from vertical migration (Gif 1). The propagation of a micro-fracture that cuts through a sealing unit, instead of having a deformation band within the sealing unit, facilitates upward CO_{2} migration (Gif 2). This allows fluid migrations from one reservoir to another. In this case, the deformation band still does not facilitate lateral (horizontal) fluid flow. This might lead to the loss of injected atmospheric carbon, lowering the efficiency of carbon sequestration.

A fault zone that displaces sealing units and reservoir rocks can act as a conduit for hydrocarbon migration. The fault zone itself has higher storage capacity (specific capacity) than that of the reservoir rocks, therefore, before the migration to other units, the fault zone has to be fully filled (Gif 3). This can slower and concentrate the fluid migration. The fault zone facilitates vertical downwards movement of CO_{2} due to its buoyancy and piezometric head differences, i.e. pressure/ hydraulic head is greater at a higher elevation, which helps store CO_{2} at depth.

Gif 4. This gif shows how fluid (CO_{2}) is facilitated by a fault zone. The fault zone acts as a conduit for fluid and it allows fluid migration to lower layers after it is filled with fluid. (One-dimensional movement is illustrated for simplicity)

Gif 2. This gif shows how the fluid (CO_{2}) is blocked by the deformation band when fluid travels across but not along with it. (One-dimensional movement is illustrated for simplicity)

Gif 3. This gif shows how the fluid (CO_{2}) is facilitated by the micro-fracture, which cuts through a sealing unit, within a fault zone. This allows fluid migration to different layers which initially is prohibited by sealing units (shale). (One-dimensional movement is illustrated for simplicity)

Gif 5. The gif shows how fault, induced by seismic events, propagates into a confined aquifer. And fluid of the confined aquifer fills the fault zone and precipitates minerals. Mineralization blocks further fluid movement. Repeated seismic events can deposit economically vulnerable vein structured ore deposit.

=== Seismic-induced ore deposits ===
Regions that are or were seismic active and with the presence of fault zones might indicate there are ore deposits. A case study in Nevada, US by Howald (2015) studied how seismic-induced fluids accumulate mineral deposits, namely sinter and gold, along spaces provided by a fault zone. Two separate seismic events were identified and dated by oxygen isotopic concentrations, followed by episodes of the upward hydrothermal fluid migrations through permeable normal fault zone. Mineralization started to take place when these hot silica-rich hydrothermal fluids met the cool meteoric water infiltrated along the fault zone until the convective flow system was shut down. In order to deposit minerals, seismic events that bring hydrothermal fluids are not the only dominant factor, the permeability of the fault zone also has to be sufficient for permitting fluid flows.

Another example taken from Sheldon (2005) also shows that development of fault zone, in this case by strike-slip faulting, facilitates mineralization. Sudden dilation happened along with strike-slip events increases the porosity and permeability along the fault zone. Larger displacement will lead to greater increase in porosity. If the faulting event cut through a sealing unit which seals a confined aquifer of over-pressured fluids, the fluids can rise through the fault zone. Then mineralization will take place along the fault zone by pressure solution, reducing the porosity of the fault zone. The fluid flow channel along the fault zone will be shut down when the pores are almost occupied by newly precipitated ore minerals. Multiple seismic events have to be occurred to form these economic ore deposit with vein structure.

== See also ==
- Carbon sequestration
- Fault (geology)
- Fault breccia
- Fault gouge
- Hydraulic conductivity
- Hydrocarbons
- Hydrology
- Hydrogeology
- Petroleum
- Permeability
- Structural geology
