= Cataclasite =

Rock found at geological faults

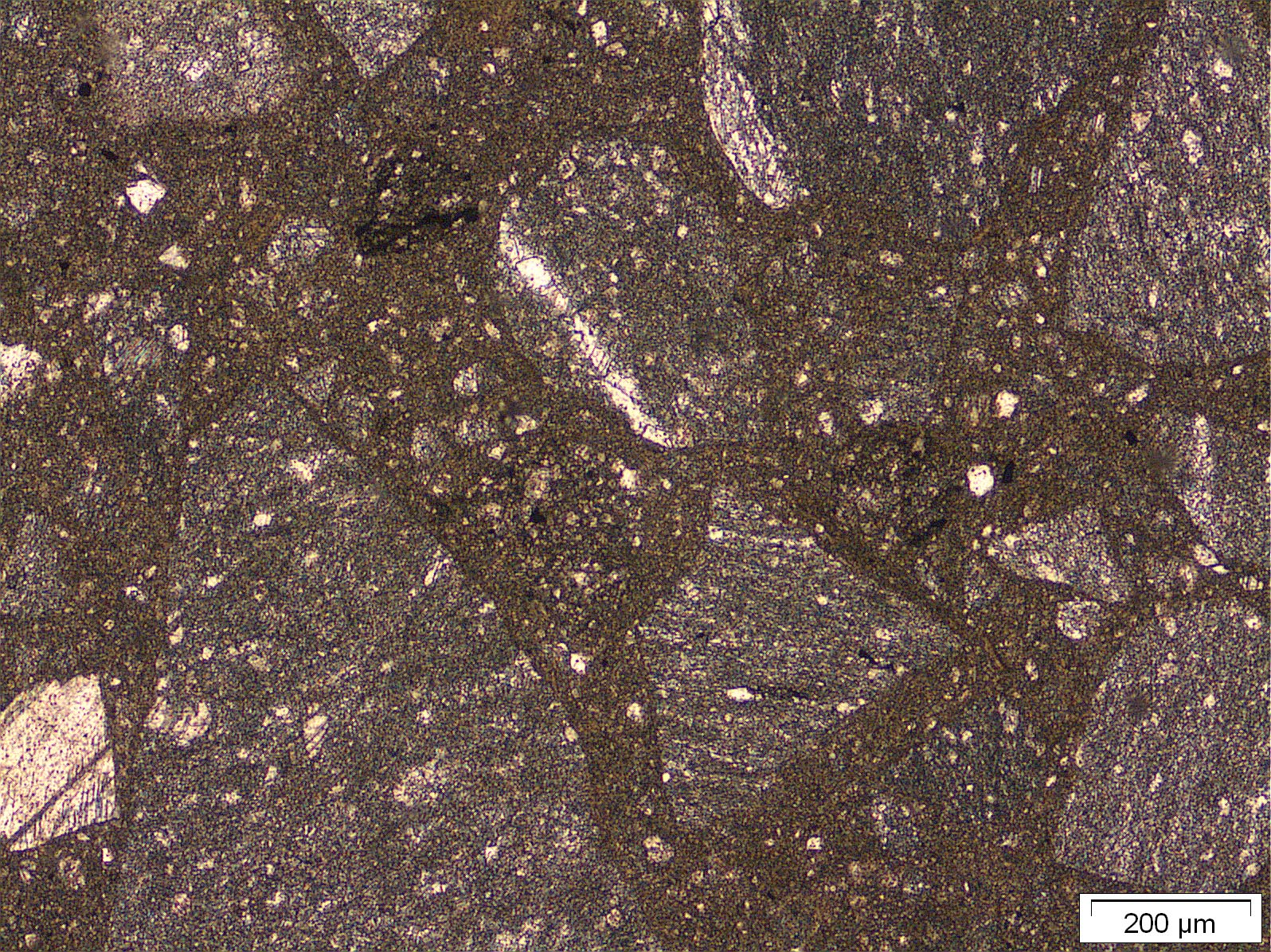
Cataclasite under a petrographic microscope. The rock in part of the Malm Formation of the Helvetic nappes; sample found in a landslide near Engelberg in the Swiss Alps.

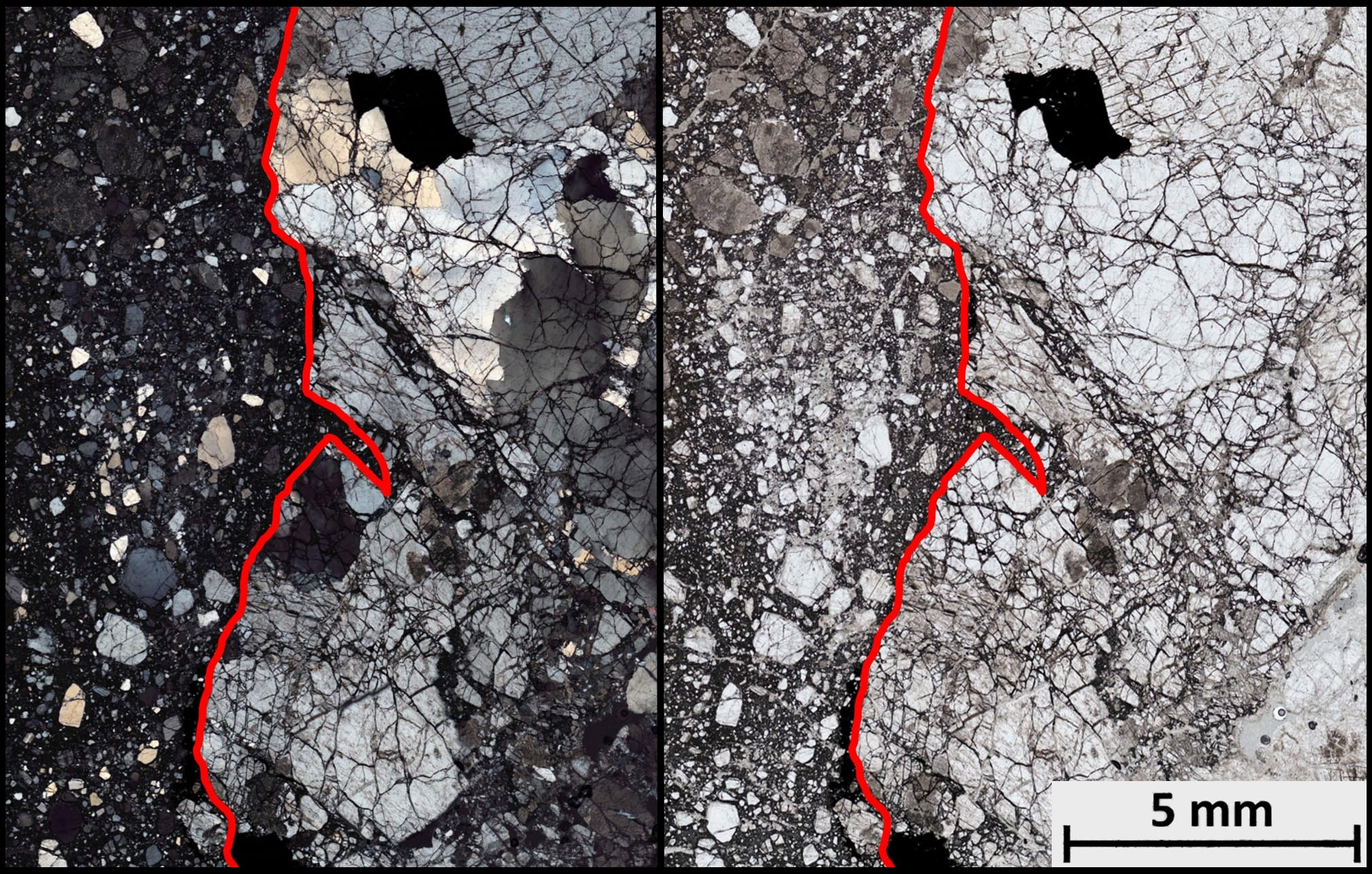
Thin section image of a cataclasite in both plane polarized light (right) and crossed polarized light (left). Contact between highly fractured wall rock (right) and clast supported cataclasite (left) is outlined in red. This rock is from the San Andreas Fault at Elizabeth Lake, California.

Cataclasite is a cohesive granular fault rock. Comminution, also known as cataclasis, is an important process in forming cataclasites. They fall into the category of cataclastic rocks which are formed through faulting or fracturing in the upper crust. Cataclasites are distinguished from fault gouge, which is incohesive, and fault breccia, which contains coarser fragments.

== Types ==
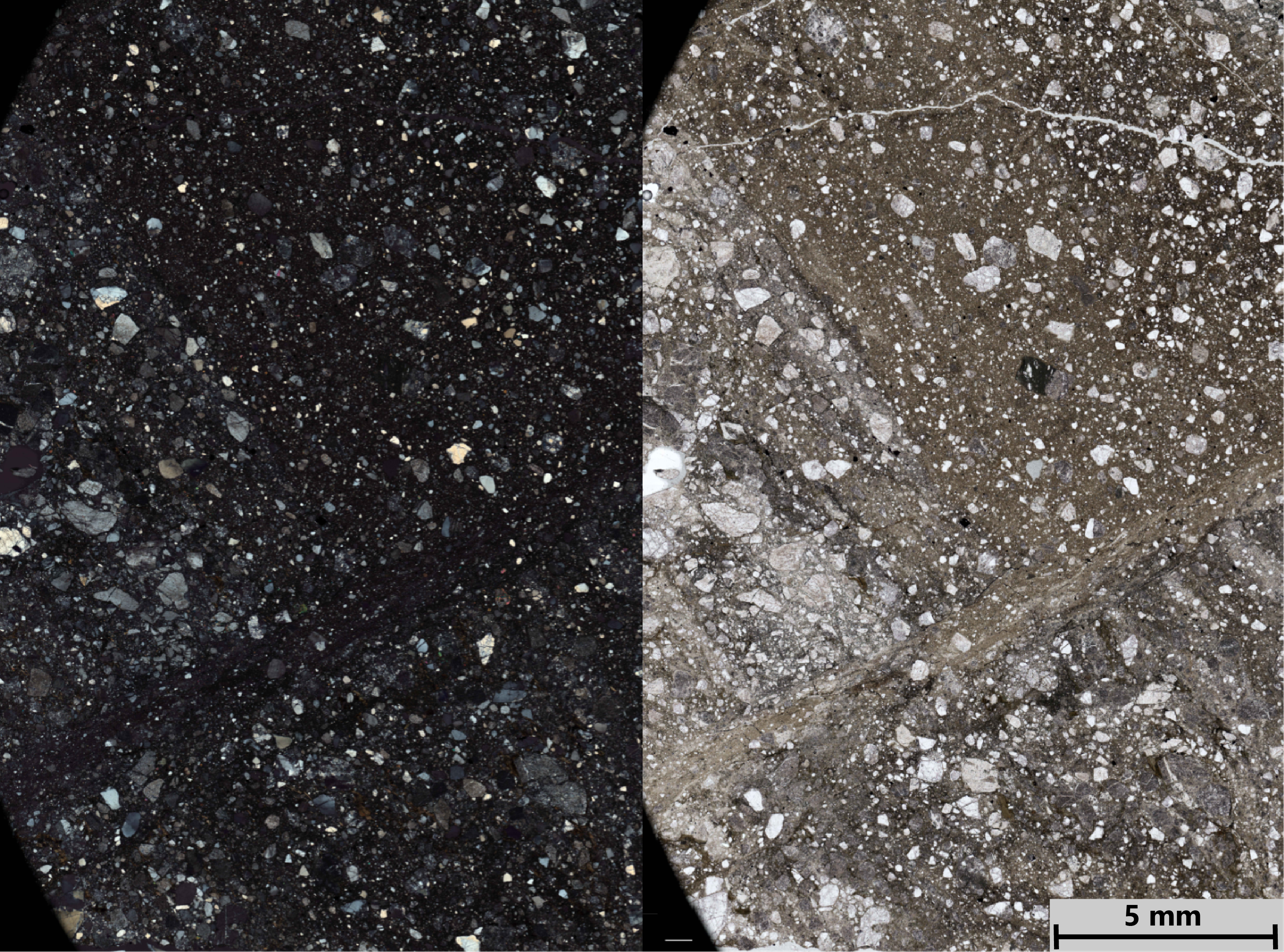
Thin section image of a foliated cataclasite in both plane polarized light (right) and crossed polarized light (left). The banding in this cataclasite is defined by grain size and ratio of clasts to matrix. This rock is from the San Andreas Fault at Elizabeth Lake, California.

Cataclasites are composed of fragments of the pre-existing wall rock as well as a matrix consisting of crushed microfragments, which cohesively holds the rock together. There are different types of classification schemes for cataclasites in the fault rock literature. The original classification scheme by Sibson classifies them by their proportion of fine-grained matrix to angular fragments. The term fault breccia is used for describing a cataclasite with coarser grains. A fault breccia is a cataclastic rock with clasts that are larger than two millimeters making up at least 30% of the rock.

These are the varieties based on the classification scheme of cataclasites proposed by Sibson:

protocataclasite : a type of cataclasite in which the matrix takes up less than 50% of the total volume,
mesocataclasite : a type of cataclasite in which the matrix occupies between 50 and 90 percent of the total volume, and
ultracataclasite : a type of cataclasite characterized by a matrix occupying greater than 90% of the total volume.

This classification scheme separates distinct features of cataclasites, but any fault rock that has been formed through brittle deformation mechanisms containing pieces of the fractured pre-existing rock type are normally referred to as cataclasites. Cataclasites are different from mylonites, another type of fault rock, that is classified by the presence of a schistosity formed through ductile deformation methods.

Although cataclasites often lack an oriented fabric, some cataclasites are foliated. According to Sibson's 1975 classification scheme, these would be classified as mylonites although it was proven experimentally that some cataclastic mechanisms can form cataclasites with an oriented foliation solely due to brittle deformation. In a modification to the original definitions, the foliated fault rock would be still considered a cataclasite because it was created by cataclastic mechanisms.

== Formation ==
Cataclasites form through the progressive fracturing of mineral grains and aggregates, a process known as comminution. Cataclasites are the result of comminution, along with frictional sliding and grain rotation during faulting. This crushing, frictional sliding and rotation of grains is referred to as cataclasis.

Comminution, along with frictional sliding and grain boundary rotation can allow a rock to macroscopically flow over a wide brittle zone in the crust. This macroscopic flow due to the combination of brittle deformation mechanisms can be referred to as cataclastic flow.

== Setting ==
Many faults near the earth's surface are brittle and show evidence of low temperature deformation. At low temperatures, there is not enough energy for the crystal grains to deform plastically, thus each grain fractures as opposed to elongation or recrystallizing. In these systems, cataclasites would be more likely to form as opposed to mylonites, which would require crystal plastic deformation. Due to quartz being the main mineral in many rocks in the brittle regime of the crust, the brittle-ductile transition for quartz can be a good indication of where cataclasites would form before ductile deformation plays a role. This normally refers to the uppermost 10–12 km of the continental crust.
