= Coastal hydrogeology =

Branch of hydrogeology

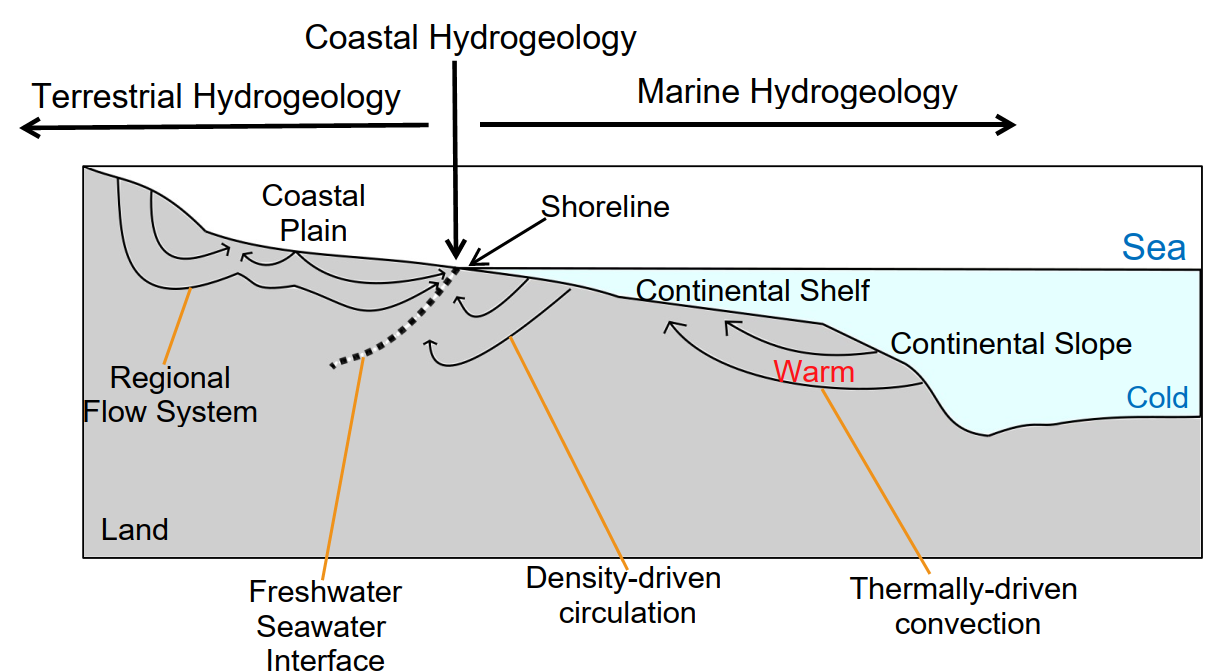
Sketch of an ocean basin indicating the study areas for terrestrial hydrogeology, coastal hydrogeology and marine hydrogeology. Modified from Wilson (2005).

Coastal Hydrogeology is a branch of Hydrogeology that focuses on the movement and the chemical properties of groundwater in coastal areas. Coastal Hydrogeology studies the interaction between fresh groundwater and seawater, including seawater intrusion, sea level induced groundwater level fluctuation, submarine groundwater discharge, human activities and groundwater management in coastal areas.

The freshwater-seawater interface is a dynamic boundary where freshwater mixes with seawater. An interface in Coastal Hydrogeology refers to the location that freshwater from aquifer meets seawater. Steady freshwater-seawater interface is an equilibrium stage where the boundary locates in a relatively fixed location, while seawater intrusion or a strong recharge rate breaks the equilibrium, leading to an unsteady freshwater-seawater interface. Mixing of groundwater and seawater creates a special chemical system that is a good indicator to show the interaction and the interface.

Human activities such as pumping of groundwater and land reclamation break the equilibrium, leading to seawater intrusion, development of a seepage zone or pollution of the ocean. The interaction between groundwater system and the ocean is complex. Preventive actions and engineering measurements are adopted to mitigate the impacts.

== Freshwater-Seawater Interface ==
Freshwater – Seawater interface or saltwater interface is an essential aspect in Coastal Hydrogeology that tries to figure out the location of the transition zone or mixing zone between freshwater and seawater. A sharp interface is formed when the transition zone is thin or narrow. Coastal aquifers can be classified in the same three categories as all aquifer systems: Sedimentary Aquifers, Hard Rock Aquifers and Limestone Aquifers.

Types of aquifers	Description
Sedimentary Aquifers	Sedimentary aquifers consist of different kinds of sediments including coarse-grained, fine-grained sediments and clay minerals. Permeability varies in these aquifers. Low-energy depositional environments and flat relief are common in coastal areas. Fine-grained sediments are common in the sea. Those sediments are less porous with low permeability. The permeability of this system drops towards the seaside. Water movement slows down with the change of permeability and the seawater-freshwater density. Igneous, sedimentary or metamorphic rocks can be the bedrock below the sedimentary aquifer system.
Hard Rock Aquifers	Hard rock aquifers are composed of igneous rock or metamorphic rock or both. Low porosity hard rock with different orientation of joints and fractures provides space for the flow of groundwater, forming a hard rock aquifer. Groundwater flow direction is controlled by the orientation of fractures and geological structures like dykes.
Limestone Aquifers	A Limestone aquifer is an aquifer that is made of carbonate minerals namely marine limestone or bioclastic limestone. Fine-grained limestone has low porosity and permeability while bioclastic limestone is the antithesis. As groundwater may dissolve carbonates aquifer forming an extensive dissolution network which is a karst aquifer. Water flows quickly and water can be stored in a karst aquifer. Groundwater would be rich in carbonic acid under a limestone or karst aquifer.

=== Ghijben – Herzberg Principle ===
The Ghijben – Herzberg Principle formulated the water table and the boundary of groundwater in an island or unconfined aquifer should form a lens-shape. This principle can estimate the bottom boundary of the interface which provides a general idea of the capacity of an aquifer. By estimating the capacity of an aquifer, we can find out the available groundwater resource in some regions.

=== Freshwater-Seawater Interface in Coastal Aquifers ===
It is assumed that the aquifers below are homogeneous in the different models so that the hydraulic conductivity of each aquifer is uniform.

Types of Aquifers	Illustrations	Description
Unconfined Continental Coastal Aquifer	Modified from Jiao and Post (2019)	Groundwater replenishment of this type of aquifer can be either from rainfall or from terrestrial groundwater. The transition zone is inside the landmass. Due to the density difference between freshwater and seawater, the freshwater tends to flow upwards to the land surface.
Unconfined Continental Aquifer with Seepage zone	Modified Van der veer (1977)	This aquifer system is similar to an unconfined continental coastal aquifer. There is a seepage zone in this case. Seepage would shift the interface towards the sea. The seawater within the seepage zone may have a slightly different chemical composition compared with seawater away from seepage zone.
Unconfined Circular Island Aquifer	Modified from Jiao and Post (2019).	Island is a case of an unconfined aquifer. As an island is surrounded by the sea, it is a coastal aquifer. Precipitation and infiltration recharge the groundwater with an island. If rainfall recharge of an island aquifer is significant, the seepage zone might form and shift the interface towards the sea. Ghijben – Herzberg Principle can be used to estimate the depth of groundwater.
Confined Continental Coastal Aquifer	Modified from Oude Essink (1996)	Regional groundwater flows can end up with confined aquifers in the coastal region and have an interface between seawater.
Confined Continental Coastal Aquifer with Seepage zone	Modified from Glover (1959)	Freshwater always flows into the sea. Forming seepage. If the hydraulic conductivity of the aquifer is low or the discharge of the aquifer is large, the seepage zone can push further to the sea.

The above figures simulate possible coastal aquifers. In reality, it is complex. Due to complex geology - non-uniform rock layers and weathering, both confined and unconfined aquifers can be found within a coast. It is possible to have multiple confined aquifers at the bottom and an unconfined aquifers at the top of a coast.

=== Seawater Intrusion ===
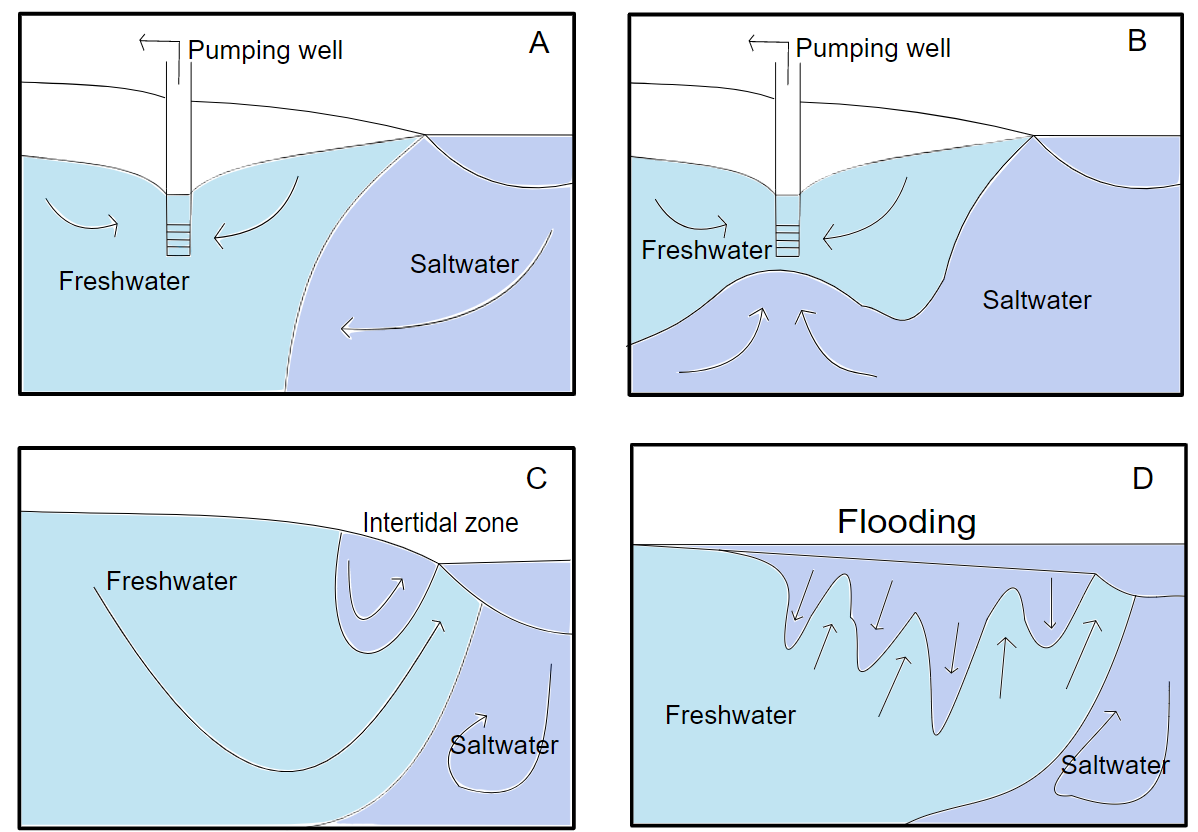
A: Horizontal seawater intrusion by pumping of water; B: Up-coning below a pumping well; C: Tide-driven and wave-driven seawater circulation in the inter tidal zone; D: Downward seawater intrusion due to flooding

Seawater intrusion is a process where seawater intrudes into a freshwater aquifer. Natural or anthropogenic factors can cause seawater intrusion. Salinization of a freshwater aquifer can be caused by the inflow of seawater due to a change in groundwater pressure, reduction in water recharge, reduction in groundwater discharge, or other sources of salt entering the aquifer. The transition zone or the interface would shift either to the land or shift vertically. Sea level rise, flooding or tsunami also leads to saltwater intrusion into the freshwater aquifer.

==== Pumping-Induced Saltwater Up-coning ====
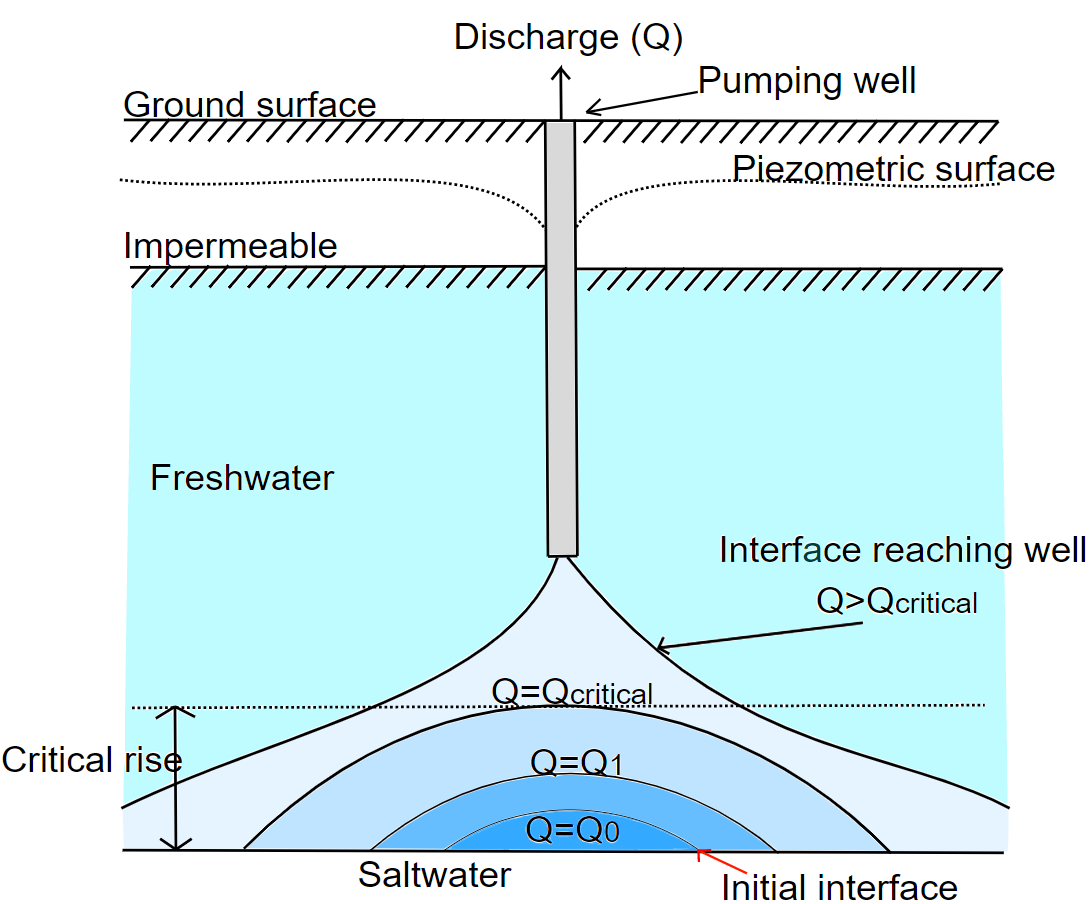
Modified from Schmorak and Mercado(1969)

Pumping of groundwater from a well near the interface could cause seawater up-coning where seawater intrudes vertically to the aquifer. When the pumping rate exceeds the maximum pumping rate or critical pumping rate, seawater would be pumped out.

==== Effects of Heterogeneity and Anisotropy ====
Aquifers should be anisotropic and heterogeneous. A high permeability layer is associated with the freshwater flow. If the hydraulic conductivity of an aquifer in a vertical direction is lower than the horizontal direction, the transition zone would shift more in a horizontal direction.

==== Tides ====
Tides can push the transition zone towards the land and widen the transition zone. Tides can strengthen the freshwater seawater mixing due to dampening of the tidal pressure forming the non-uniform flow of groundwater. The greater the tidal amplitude, the greater the mixing effect. Less dampening in an aquifer would lead to a more uniform flow.

==== Other factors ====
Geological structures that cross-cut different layers such as faults or dykes can affect the direction and velocity of seawater intrusion. Dykes, an igneous unit that is impermeable or low in hydraulic conductivity might stop the intrusion of seawater. Faults also affect the direction of water flow which is studied by Fault Zone Hydrogeology. Both regular and catastrophic flooding can cause downward intrusion of seawater recreating the transition zone of the fresh-salt water. Diffusion would also be responsible for seawater intrusion, as there is a net flow of solutes from high concentration to low concentration. For example, a complete salinization of a 10 m thick layer of freshwater takes thousands of years through diffusion. Other factors can include pumping-induced seawater intrusion.

== Submarine Groundwater Discharge ==
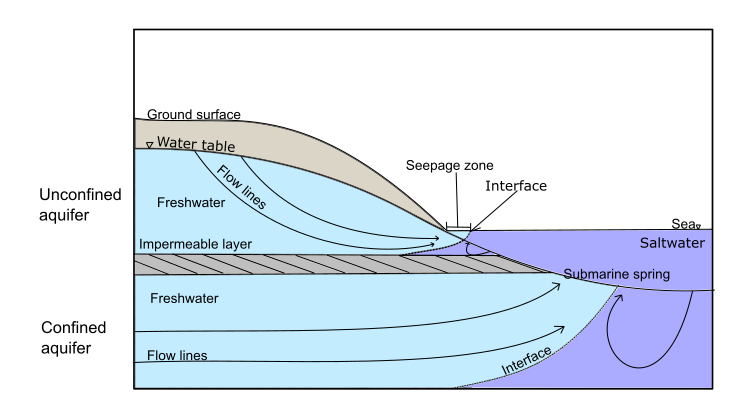
A sketch for the submarine groundwater discharge. Submarine groundwater discharge= meteoric water + freshwater from aquifers + recirculated seawater. Modified from Pacific Coastal and Marine Science Center (2021).

Submarine groundwater discharge (SGD) is the groundwater flows across the interface of the aquifer and the sea. It refers to the flow of water shifting towards the sea. Nearshore submarine groundwater discharge is defined as a range of 0 to 10 m, embayment SGD is defined as 10 m to 10 km and offshore SGD is defined as more than 10 km. Topography, salinity and temperature convention and tidal pumping are responsible for the driving force for the submarine groundwater discharge.

=== Topography-Driven Flow ===
The topography and geology of an area affect the permeability and flow network of groundwater. For an unconfined aquifer, groundwater discharges would be near shore and discharge decreases with the propagation towards the sea. For confined aquifers, groundwater can flow further towards the sea to the embayment zone or even develop submarine springs.

== Groundwater Tidal Dynamics ==
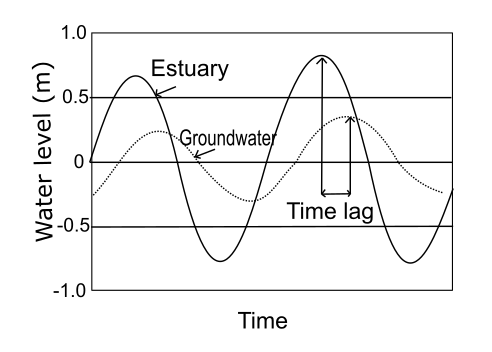
A graph shows the groundwater level and sea level changes with respect to the tide on a small island in Portugal. The solid line represents the sea level change in the estuary and the dotted line is date from a piezometer that installed 50 m apart from the coastal line. It shows a time lag between the sea tide and the tide of groundwater. It indicates there is tide in the groundwater system. Modified from Erskine (1991)

Periodic sea level changes by tides would cause a fluctuation in the groundwater level of a coastal aquifer system. The tidal signal of sea tides becomes more attenuated and delayed with increasing distance to the land. Water level fluctuations in the wells can be caused by the degree of connection between the ocean and the aquifer; groundwater flows well connected to the sea; alternating loading and unloading of the sea tide leads to plastic deformation. Tidal efficiency of the magnitude of the oscillation of water level in a well to the oscillation of sea level is about 42% to 44%. For example, if the magnitude of the oscillation of the sea level is 1 meter, the magnitude of the oscillation of water level will be 0.42 to 0.44 meter. However, the further away from the coast, the groundwater fluctuation would be lower.

== Chemistry of Coastal Groundwater Systems ==
The coastal groundwater system consists of terrestrial (freshwater) groundwater, seawater and a mixture of two. Rainfall is the main source of the recharge of terrestrial groundwater. In the mixing zone, dilution occurs that results in the different chemical compositions of water there.

=== Salinity ===
Marine, natural terrestrial and anthropogenic terrestrial is the source of salinity. The total dissolved solids (TDS) of the ocean are between 33 and 36.5 gl^{−1}. The TDS of standard seawater at 25 °C is 36gl^{−1}. TDS of seawater would be lower near the coast as there is fresh water supply through a river. The charge in TDS of seawater can indicate the existence of groundwater supply, submarine spring and the transition zone.

Table of Salinity Classes Based on Total Dissolved Solids (TDS) Concentrations
Classification of total dissolved solids (TDS)	TDS (mg l^{−1})	Description
Fresh	0 – 1000	Chemical is highly diluted. Drinking water.
Brackish	1000-10000	Evaporation of groundwater increases the chemical concentration of water. Or intrusion of seawater increases the chemical concentration of water. Water is too saline to be drinkable.
Saline	10000-36000	Similar to seawater. Strong evaporation of groundwater or fully mixing with seawater.
Hyper-Saline	36000-100000	Strong evaporation on seawater or groundwater under a closed system.
Brine	>100000	Dissolution of rock salts or seawater being highly evaporated.

=== Electrical Conductivity ===
Electrical conductivity (EC) is another way to explain salinity. Electrical conductivity shows the ability of water to carry electrical current. Higher electrical conductivity reflects a higher concentration of dissolved ions. Electrical conductivity increases by 2% when the temperature increases by 1 °C.

=== Chemical Composition of Terrestrial Groundwater ===
Terrestrial groundwater is dominated by cations: potassium (K^{+}), sodium (Na^{+}), calcium (Ca^{+}) and magnesium (Mg^{+}) and anions: chlorine (Cl^{−}), bicarbonate (HCO^{3-}) and sulfate (SO_{4}^{2-}). Each ion has a concentration of >1mgl^{−1}. The chemical composition highly depends on the geology which is the composition of local rocks and the chemical composition of recharge sources like rainfall and rivers. Fresh groundwater is likely alkaline as there is calcium and magnesium.

=== Chemical Composition of Seawater ===
Seawater is dominated by sodium (Na^{+}) and chlorine (Cl^{−}). The chemical composition of seawater has small variability between different oceans due to the long residence time which facilitates mixing.

=== Chemical Processes in Coastal Aquifer ===
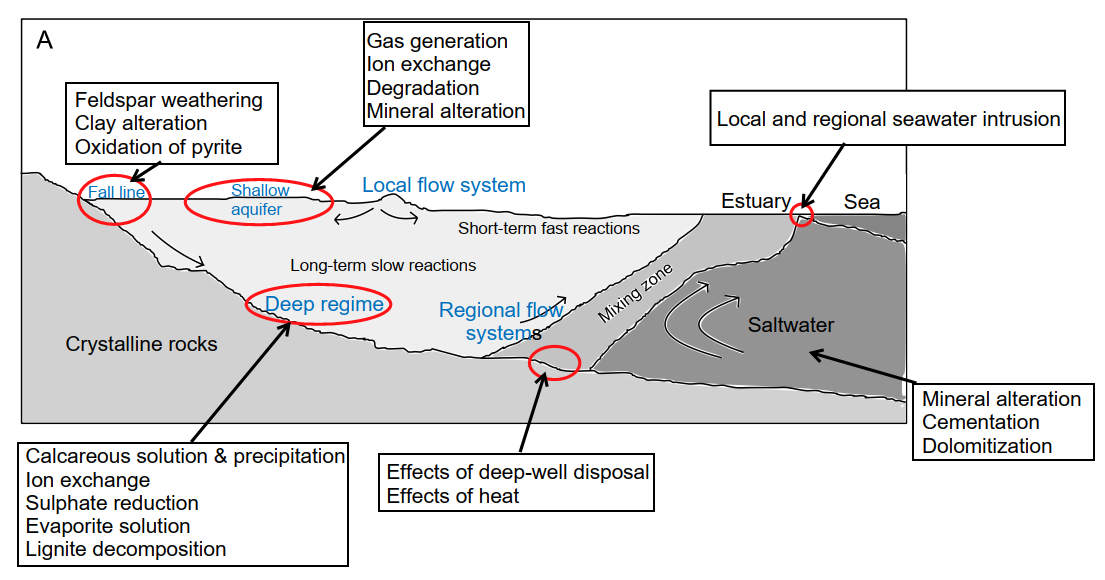
Chemical reactions in the coastal aquifer in a humid region. Modified Back et al. (1993)

Physical and chemical reactions occur in coastal aquifers, including oxidation-reduction reactions, mineral dissolution and precipitation, acid-base reactions, ion exchange, and gases dissolution and exsolution. Those chemical processes also happen in terrestrial aquifer system. The rate of different chemical processes depend on temperature and pressure of different part of the aquifers. Rain is the major recharge for different aquifers. Thus, groundwater would be acidic. Groundwater becomes less acidic with increases flow path or flow distance.

==== Ion Exchange ====
Seawater mainly contains sodium and chlorine while fresh groundwater is dominated by calcium and bicarbonate. Cation exchange occurs in the transition zone given by the chemical equation:

Na^{+}+1/2Ca-X_{2} → 1/2Ca^{2+}+Na-X,

where X is the exchange site on the soil particles. Compared to seawater, the water in the transition zone would have excess calcium and be depleted in sodium. Compare with fresh water, it is the opposite case. Other cations like magnesium and potassium exchange as well. Magnesium and calcium would be exchanged for sodium.

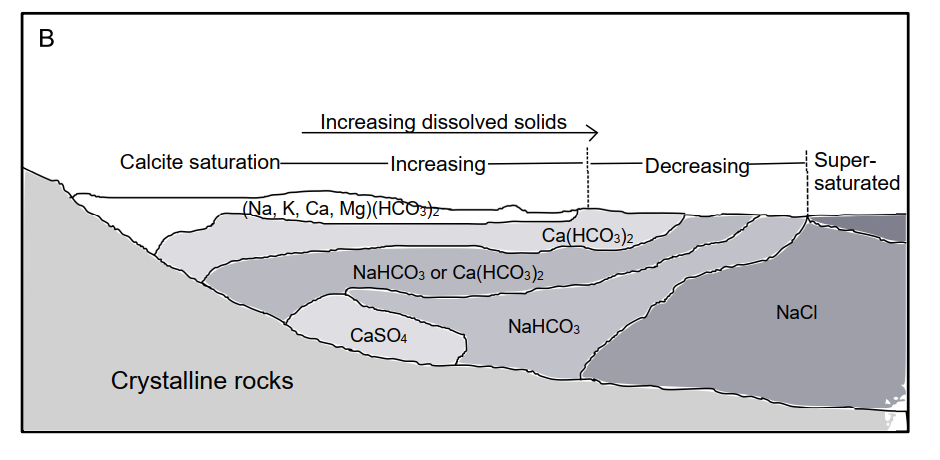
A sketch explains the chemical evolution of groundwater in a coastal area. Modified from Back et al. (1993)

In a limestone aquifer, calcite dissolves due to the acidity of groundwater. With the presence of magnesium, dolomite may form in the transition zone.

==== Mineral Dissolution and Precipitation ====
As rain is acidic, it dissolves different minerals. For example, rain dissolves calcite or dolomite inside the aquifer. In the transition zone where fresh groundwater meets seawater, dolomitization occurs due to abundant magnesium of seawater. Lead to precipitation of dolomite.

==== Reduction-Oxidation Reactions ====
Reduction-Oxidation reactions (Redox) takes place in the recharge areas where organic matter is available. Oxygen dissolves into freshwater when rainfall or river penetrates soil with organic matter. Oxygen may lost under redox reactions and microbiological processes. Oxidation of pyrite or sulphide minerals also consume the dissolved oxygen inside water. Dissolved oxygen concentration level in groundwater decreases during long travel distance. Anaerobic conditions occur in deep confined aquifer. Under anaerobic conditions, sulphate reduction, methanogenesis and ferric iron reduction might occur. Leading to dissolve of iron, manganese, nitrogen dioxide, nitrogen, methane and hydrogen sulfide into groundwater.

=== Chemical and Isotopic Indicators ===
The change in the chemical composition of groundwater is an indicator of seawater intrusion. It prevents the multi-sources of chloride, leading to a change in salinity of groundwater. Chemical concentration ratios including Na/Cl, Ca/Cl, Mg/Ca, Cl/Br, Ca/Mg and Cl/HCO3 can be used to distinguish the seawater intrusion.

	Standard seawater	Freshwater
Ratio	Molar ratio	Description
Na^{+}/Cl^{−}	0.86	In granitic and alkaline volcanic areas, the molar ratio of freshwater can reach 1.5-3.
Mg^{2+}/Ca^{2+}	4.5 -5	In terrestrial fresh groundwater, the molar ratio <1. Limestone aquifer molar ratio =0.5-0.7.
Br^{−}/Cl^{−}	0.0015	Br^{−} concentration of seawater is greater than freshwater.
Cl^{−}/HCO^{−}_{3}	318	The Cl^{−}/HCO^{−}_{3} ratio of freshwater <2

== Anthropogenic Impacts ==
=== Reclamation ===
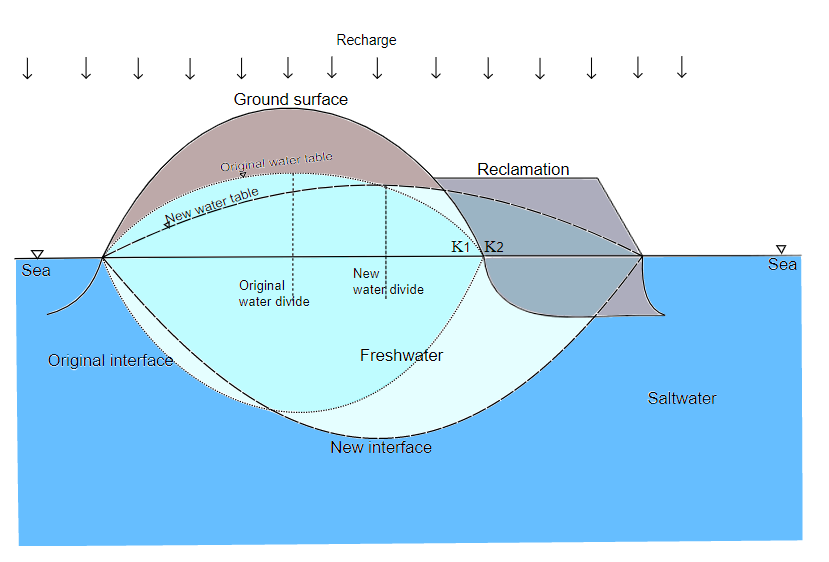
This diagram tries to explain how an unconfined aquifer change after reclamation. Water divide and flow pattern to the aquifer change due to reclamation.

Land reclamation is a way to create flat land in coastal areas for coastal urban development. Reclamations affect regional groundwater flow systems, the location of groundwater discharge zones, seepage zones, groundwater divide, the interface between seawater and fresh groundwater and the water chemistry. It takes years to decades to reach a new equilibrium after reclamation.

==== Reclamation – Chemical and Groundwater Change ====
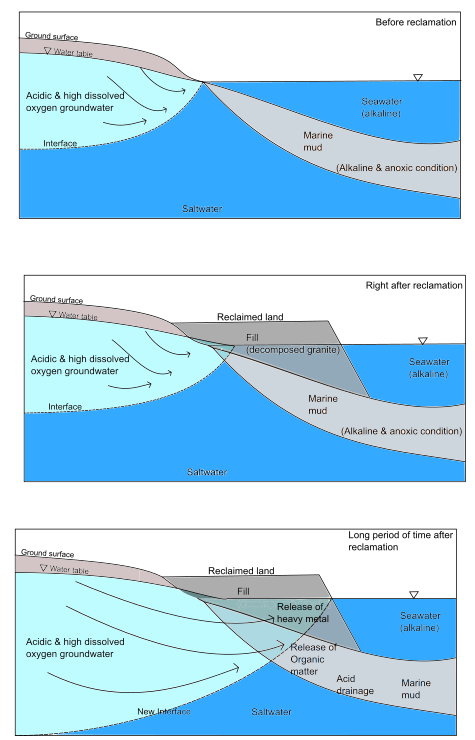
Annotated diagrams show how the physical and chemical of groundwater change before, just after and after a long period of time reclamation. Pollutants may release out and pollute the groundwater. Modified from Jiao and Post (2019)

Land-fill materials would change the equilibrium of the coastal areas. Land-fill materials interact with groundwater, seawater and marine sediments chemically and physically. Fill materials can be sand, completely weathered igneous rock or even waste. The placement of fill materials and diversity of fill materials can make the aquifer heterogeneous. It is difficult to determine the chemical change in groundwater in a general way. It depends on the fill materials.

The groundwater discharge after reclamation decreases as the fill increases subsurface flow path length. As a result, the water level elevation in the upstream or attitude would rise. Rainfall recharges the new land and increases the storage capacity of the land. Increasing the water level and seaward groundwater discharge and shifting the water divide in the future. Lengthening of the groundwater flow paths can dissolve the pollutants inside the marine mud and bring the pollutants to the ocean.

=== Sea Level Changes to Coastal Hydrogeology ===
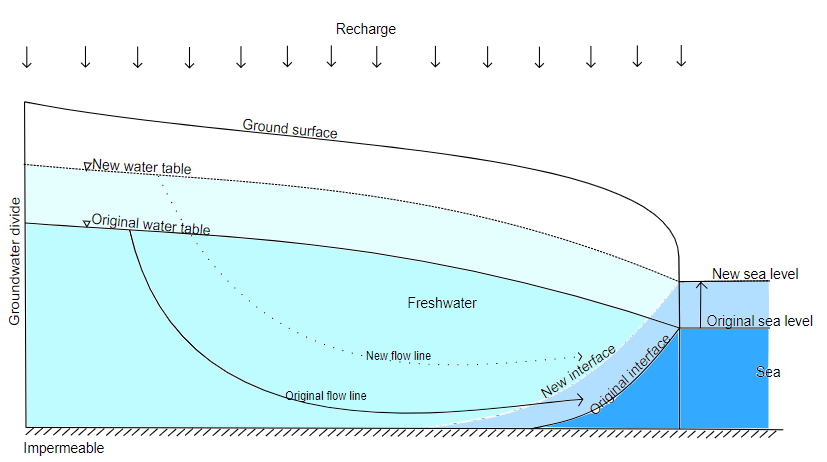
Water level and interface in an unconfined continental aquifer with a sloping shoreface after sea level rise with inundation. (Modified from Jiao and Post (2019))

Sea level rise and flooding would push the interface towards the land. Thus, seawater intrudes the land vertically and horizontally. A reduction in the recharge area leads to a reduction in the discharge of groundwater and groundwater level. For islands, sea level rise would reduce the freshwater volume resulting in a smaller freshwater lens. Sea level rise also increases the coastal erosion rate leading to shoreline retreat.

=== Seawater Intrusion Management ===
Seawater intrusion leads to social and economic loss. It is important to promote seawater intrusion management to prevent seawater intrusion including increases in freshwater recharge, pumping control, well design improvement, building barriers and land and water management.

==== Increase of Freshwater Recharge ====
For areas that have sufficient fresh water supply, fresh water can be injected into the aquifers named aquifer storage and recovery (ASR). Apart from injection to pumping wells, infiltration basins or canals are used for infiltration and the replenishment of groundwater.

==== Well Design Improvements ====
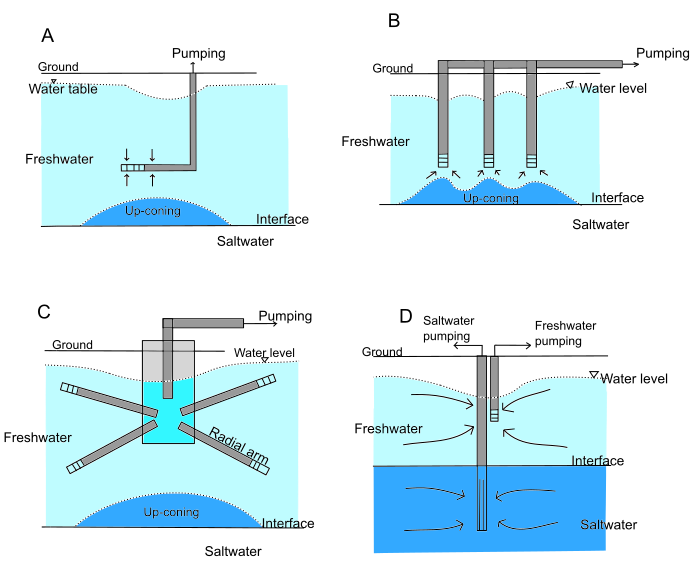
A: horizontal pumping well; B: multiple pumping wells in well distributed; C: Radial wells, water is stored in the central tank; D: Seavenger well. Those well designs are expected to reduce the rate of up-coning. Modified from Sufi et al.(1988).

Improvements on the location and design of a well can minimize the effect of seawater intrusion. For example, building a well that is close to the water table, having a well that far away from the transition zone. Multiple wells with low pumping rate, horizontal pumping wells and radial wells can be built to reduce the chance of seawater intrusion. As well as calculating the maximum pumping rate and critical pumping rate of a well. Prevent the pumping rate from exceeding the limit which is over-pumping.

==== Engineered Barriers ====
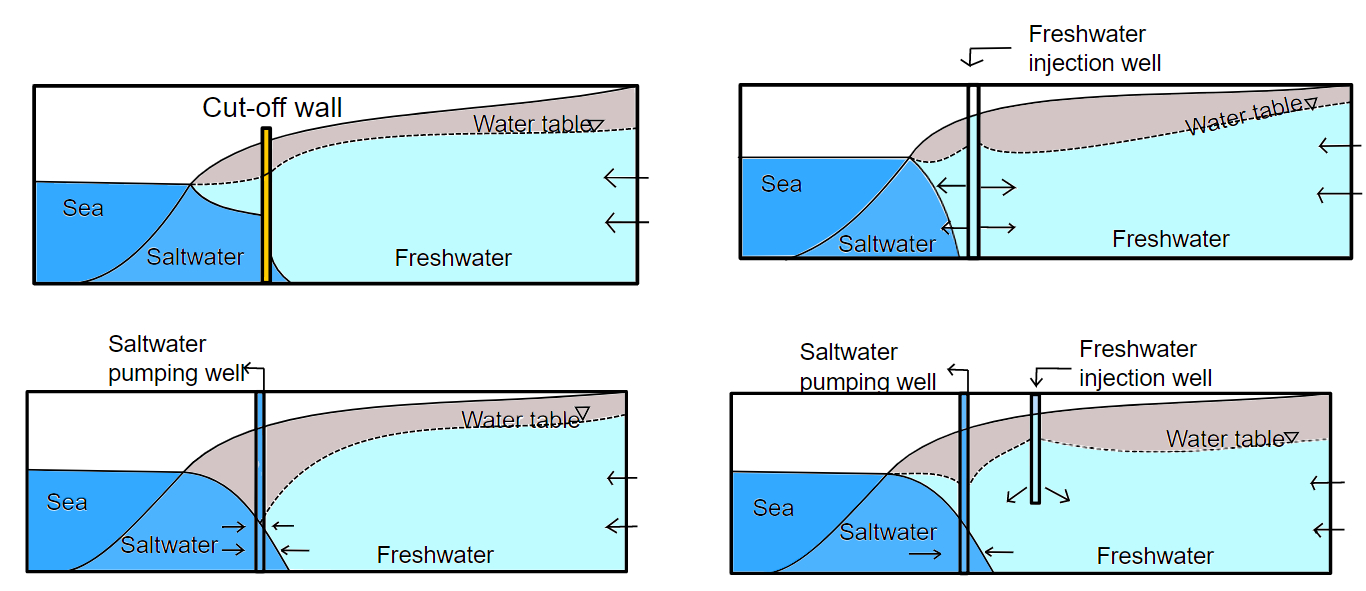
Types of barriers to control seawater intrusion. (A) Cut-off wall; (B) Injection well only; (C) Saltwater pumping only; (D) Pumping and injection wells (Pool and Carrera, 2010).

Engineered barriers can be built to reduce freshwater flow to the sea and seawater intrusion into the aquifer. Engineered barriers can be hydraulic barriers or physical barriers. Hydraulic barriers operate by injecting fresh water into the well or pumping saltwater from the well. Water from rivers, precipitation, and treated wastewater can be injected into the well. The location of the injection well should be far away from the pumping well to prevent the neutralization of pumping and injection of water. Physical barriers are impermeable walls, that cut off the interaction between fresh groundwater and seawater. Cut-off walls have been built since the 1970s. Slurry walls and grout walls are a type of cut-off walls. Slurry walls are made of water, soil and bentonite or concrete, forming an impermeable wall. Grout walls are made of cement, bentonite or silicate reagents.

== See also ==
- Hydrogeology
- Fault zone hydrogeology
- Groundwater
- Groundwater recharge
- Saltwater intrusion
- Salinity
- Total dissolved solids
- Tides
- Submarine groundwater discharge
- Well
- Isotope hydrology
