= Fault breccia =

Breccia formed by tectonic forces

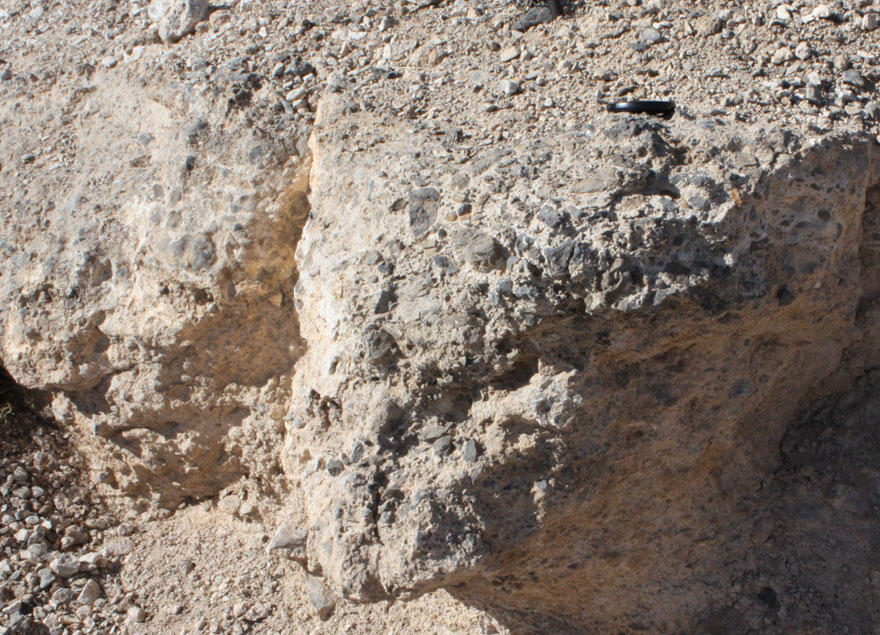
Fault breccia of the Keystone Thrust, Red Rock Canyon National Conservation Area, Nevada.

Fault breccia, or tectonic breccia, is a breccia (a rock type consisting of angular clasts) that was formed by tectonic forces.

Fault breccia is a tectonite formed by localized zone of brittle deformation (a fault zone) in a rock. Brecciation in fault zones influences fault zone hydrogeology in its interaction with groundwater and petroleum deposits.

== Origin ==
Fault breccias are tectonites formed primarily by tectonic movement along a localized zone of brittle deformation (a fault zone) in a rock formation or province.

The grinding and milling occurring when the two sides of the fault zone moving along each other results in a material that is made of loose fragments. Because of this fragmentation fault zones are easily infiltrated by groundwater.

Secondary minerals such as calcite, epidote, quartz or talc can precipitate from the circulating groundwater filling the voids and cementing the rock. However, when the tectonic movement along the fault zone continues the cement itself can be fragmented leading to a new gouge material containing neoformed clasts.

Deeper in the Earth's crust, where temperatures and pressures are higher, the rocks in the fault zone can still brecciate, but they keep their internal cohesion. The resulting type of rock is called a cataclasite.

== Properties ==
Fault breccia has no cohesion; it is normally an unconsolidated rock type, unless cementation took place at a later stage. Sometimes a distinction is made between fault gouge and fault breccia, the first has a smaller grain size.

Zones of fault breccia and fault gouge in rocks can be a hazard for the construction of tunnels and mines, as the non-cohesive zones form weak places in the rock where a tunnel can collapse more easily.

== See also ==
- Breccia
- Cataclasite
- Mylonite
- Fault (geology)
