= Trial pit =

Excavation of ground to study its composition and structure

Symbol used in drawings

A trial pit (or test pit) is an excavation of ground in order to study or sample the composition and structure of the subsurface, usually dug during a site investigation, a soil survey or a geological survey. Trial pits are dug before the construction. They are dug to determine the geology and the water table of that site.

Trial pits are usually between 1 and 4 metres deep, and are dug either by hand or using a mechanical digger. Building and construction regulations clearly state that any trial pits that concede deeper than 1.2 metres should be secured against structural collapse, if they are to be entered by people.
