= Cataclastic rock =

Type of fault rock

A cataclastic rock is a type of fault rock that has been wholly or partly formed by the progressive fracturing and comminution of existing rocks, a process known as cataclasis. Cataclasis involves the granulation, crushing, or milling of the original rock, then rigid-body rotation and translation of mineral grains or aggregates before lithification. Cataclastic rocks are associated with fault zones and impact event breccias.

== Classification ==
Various classification schemes have been proposed for the cataclastic rocks, but changes in understanding of the processes involved in their formation and better knowledge of the variety of such rocks has made a simple classification difficult, particularly where distinctions cannot be made in hand specimens. Sibson's 1977 classification of fault rocks was the first to include an understanding of the deformation mechanisms involved and all subsequent schemes have been based on this. Fault breccias have been further classified in terms of their origins; attrition, distributed crush and implosion brecciation, and, borrowing from the cave-collapse literature, crack, mosaic and chaotic from their clast concentration.

Mylonite was originally defined as a cataclastic rock but is now understood to have formed mainly by crystal-plastic processes.

== Types ==
=== Cataclasite ===
Cataclasite is a fault rock that consists of angular clasts in a finer-grained matrix. It is normally non-foliated but some varieties have been described with a well-developed planar fabric that are known as foliated cataclasites. Cataclasite grades into fault breccia as the percentage of visible clasts increases to more than 30%.

=== Fault breccia ===
Fault breccia is a fault rock that consists of large fragments of rock in a fine-grained matrix. It may be either cohesive or incohesive. The matrix may also include mineral veins formed in voids between the clasts, which may themselves become fractured by later movements on the fault.

=== Fault gouge ===
Fault gouge is an unconsolidated and incohesive type of fault rock consisting almost entirely of finely crushed material. Varieties that have a large clay mineral content are known as clay gouges.

=== Pseudotachylite ===
Pseudotachylite is a fault rock that has the appearance of the basaltic glass, tachylyte. It is dark in color and has a glassy appearance. It is generally found either along a fault surface or as veins injected into the fault walls. Most pseudotachylites have clearly formed by frictional melting, associated with either seismic faulting, some large landslides or meteorite impacts. Extensive, exhumed networks of pseudotachylyte-bearing fault zones, such as in the Homestake shear zone of Colorado, can be mapped across multiple kilometers and analyzed to evaluate ancient earthquake rupture geometry, lateral slip distribution, and rupture directivity at mid-crustal hypocentral depths.

== Formation ==
Cataclastic rocks form by brittle processes in the upper part of the crust in areas of moderate to high strain, particularly in fault zones. The two main mechanisms involved are microfracturing (breaking the original rock into fragments) and frictional sliding/rolling of the fragments, combined with further fracturing.

== Cataclastic flow ==
Cataclastic flow is the main deformation mechanism accommodating large strains above the brittle–ductile transition zone. It can be regarded as a ductile mechanism, although one that takes place within the elastico-frictional regime of deformation. Deformation is accommodated by the sliding and rolling of fragments within the cataclastic rock. Cycles of cementation and refracturing are generally recognised in such rocks.

== See also ==
- Pyroclastic
