= Fault gouge =

Crushed rock found near faults

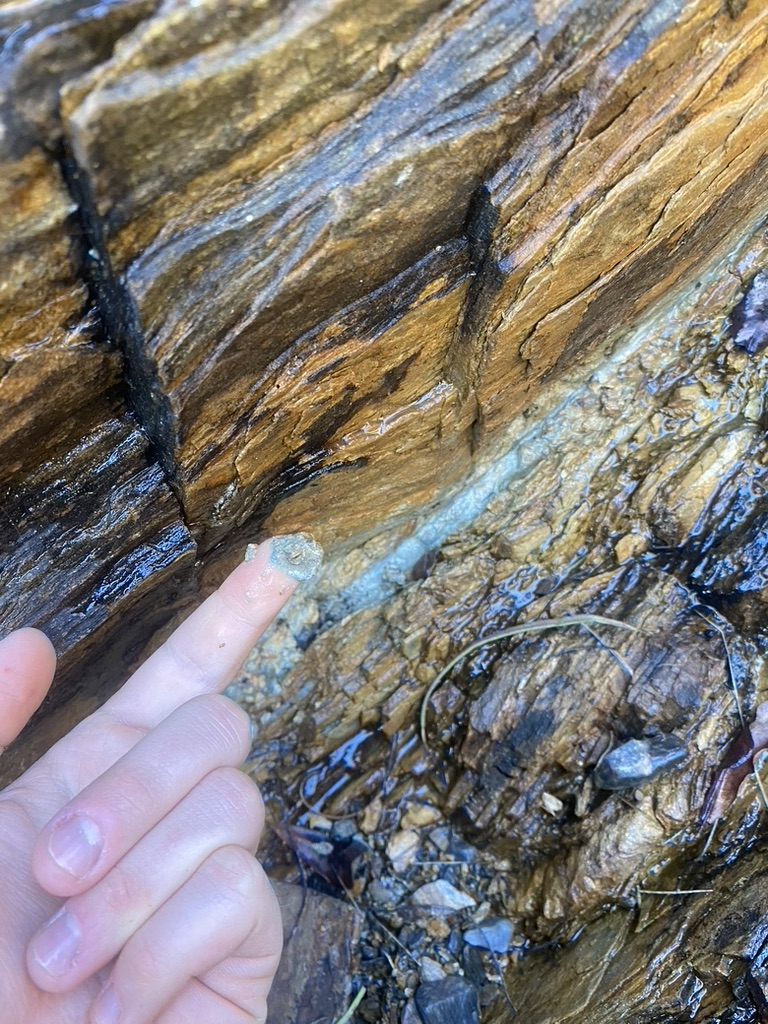
Fault gouge in a schist on Bailey Island, Maine

Fault gouge is a type of fault rock best defined by its grain size. It is found as incohesive fault rock (rock which can be broken into its component granules at the present outcrop, only aided with fingers/pen-knife), with less than 30% clasts >2mm in diameter. Fault gouge forms in near-surface fault zones with brittle deformation mechanisms. There are several properties of fault gouge that influence its strength including composition, water content, thickness, temperature, and the strain rate conditions of the fault.

== Formation ==
Fault gouge forms from localization of strain within fault zones under brittle conditions near the Earth's surface. The grinding and milling from the two sides of the fault moving along each other results in grain size reduction and fragmentation. First, a fault breccia will form with more fragmental material and with continued grinding the rock will transition into a fault gouge with fewer and smaller fragments, enhancing fluid-rock interaction to alter some minerals and produce clay. Both the rate and manner of slip in a fault zone, as well as the available fluids, can determine the formation of different fault rock varieties.

=== Role of pore fluids ===
The formation of faults is determined by the stress conditions in the Earth's crust. Pore fluid pressure in a rock can significantly reduce the stress needed to induce faulting by reducing the effective normal stress. Fault gouge formation can decrease permeability of the rock through creation of clay minerals, leading to higher pore fluid pressures in a localized zone and to slip localization within the gouge.

=== Cataclastic deformation ===
Cataclastic deformation is one of the main modes of fault gouge formation, as fault gouge is a common product of cataclasis at low pressure and temperature conditions. It is dependent on friction and is considered a brittle deformation mechanism. To further elucidate, cataclasis involves the granulation of grains due to both brittle fracture and rigid body rotation—where rigid body rotation is when mineral grains exhibit rotation in agreement with the fault plane shear sense. The corresponding cataclasis intensity is exhibited by a decrease in median grain size. As well, the development of fault gouge may also be accompanied by a degradation in sorting.

== Classification ==
Fault rocks may be classified in terms of their textures, although the divisions are often gradational. After the classification scheme proposed by Sibson, fault gouge is defined as an incohesive fault with randomly oriented fabric and less than 30% visible fragments comprising the rock. An incohesive fault rock with more than 30% fragments is a fault breccia and cohesive fault rocks are either of the cataclasite series (non foliated) or the mylonite series (foliated). This was later modified to include foliated cataclasite. This classification scheme was further simplified for ease of the classification in the field. It defined fault gouge as having less than 30% clasts > 2mm and is found as incohesive fault rock at the present outcrop. Based on this classification scheme, fault breccias can undergo subdivision (as chaotic, mosaic, and crackle breccias). This subdivision allows for fault breccias to be foliated or non foliated, cohesive or incohesive, as well as found to contain a fine-grained matrix, small clasts, and even crystalline cement in varying proportions.

== Properties, friction and fault strength ==
The fault strength of a gouge is dependent on its composition, its water content, its thickness, temperature and it can easily be affected by any changes in effective normal stress and slip rate. These parameters all have an effect on the coefficient of friction.

=== Byerlee's law ===
Byerlee's law is what is used to describe the frictional strength of a rock. It is as follows:
$$\tau = \mu* \sigma{\scriptstyle\text{n}}$$
Where:

- $\tau$ = shear stress
- $\mu$ = coefficient of friction
- $\sigma{\scriptstyle\text{n}}$ = normal stress

=== Composition ===
The composition will have an impact on the slip behavior of a fault. A high frictional strength is associated with a composition high in strong minerals such as quartz and feldspar. The composition and concentration of clay minerals will affect the fault behavior in the brittle crust. Gouges dominated by clay minerals (montmorillonite, illite, and chlorite) are consistently weaker. Those with a high concentration in montmorillonite are significantly weaker than those with a composition high in chlorite or illite.

=== Permeability ===
The composition also impacts the permeability of a gouge. It is an important parameter controlling fault mechanics and frictional stability. The presence of water will reduce the frictional resistance between the grains of phyllosilicate minerals Also, the permeability before shearing is usually higher than after the deformation. However, the influence of shearing varies depending on the composition. For example, with montmorillonite or illite, a sharp decrease is visible in post-shear permeability. However, with minerals such as chlorite, the higher permeability will be maintained even after shearing. Because chlorite crystals form at higher pressure and temperature, it is most likely to remain as larger aggregates in shear zones compared to the smaller size of montmorillonite or illite grains which explains why the permeability is less affected. Fault gouges rich in chlorite and quartz keep their high permeability to a significant depth. On the other hand, fault gouges with a low permeability such as gouges high in clay minerals are more susceptible to develop high pore pressures because fluid flow is unable to diffuse.

==== Gouge thickness ====
Gouge thickness increases over time with accumulation of slip events along a fault. A larger thickness of fault gouge is associated with higher degrees of pore fluid pressure.

==== Temperature ====
As mentioned earlier, the frictional resistance of a gouge can change as temperature varies. However, its effect differs based on the mineral composition. For example, in the case of quartz gouges, an increase in temperature will most likely decrease the coefficient of friction while a decrease in temperature leads to an increase in the coefficient of friction.

== Examples ==
The San Andreas Fault

Bonita Fault: Found in New Mexico, near Tucumcari, this normal fault is also an example of quartz gouge. Its gouge is found in the Mesa Rica Sandstone, within 40m of the fault contact. This fault also exhibits many subsidiary faults and shear fractures within its fault zone (60m wide)

Hurricane Fault: This fault is found in Pintura, Utah, with its gouge found in the Coconino Sandstone. This is another example of quartz gouge.

Nojima Fault Gouge: This fault produced thin oscillating foliations of pseudotachylyte and fine fault gouge from granite at a depth of 3 km.

San Andreas Fault Gouge: Consists of two active shear zones: the southwest deforming zone and the central deforming zone. At the San Andreas Fault Observatory at Depth (SAFOD) they are overarchingly composed of serpentinite porphyroclasts and sedimentary rock amongst a Magnesium-rich clay matrix. Saponite, corrensite (a clay mineral), quartz, and feldspars compose the southwest deforming zone. Saponite, quartz, and calcite compose the central deforming zone.

Muddy Mountain Thrust: This fault is located in the southeast of Nevada, USA and represents tens of kilometers of transport at near-surface or surface conditions. The fault gouge contains less than 30% fragments of hanging wall dolomite and footwall sandstone clasts within a yellow-stained aggregate matrix with granular to foliated texture.

== See also ==
- Fault breccia
- Fault (geology)
