= HGS =

HGS may refer to

- HGS (gene), a human gene
- HGS (electronic toll collection), used in highways and bridges in Turkey
- Hampstead Garden Suburb, Greater London, England
- Hastings Airport (Sierra Leone), IATA code HGS
- Hastings railway station, a railway station in Sussex, England; station code HGS
- Head Gear System, a combat helmet
- Head-up guidance system, a transparent display that allows pilots to view aircraft flight data without needing to look down at the instrument panel
- Hervormd Gereformeerde Staatspartij, a Dutch political party
- Human Genome Sciences, an American pharmaceutical company
- HydroGeoSphere, hydrology modelling software
- Mercury sulfide (HgS)
- Halifax Grammar School, in Nova Scotia, Canada
- Handsworth Grammar School, in Birmingham, England
- The Harvey Grammar School, in Folkestone, Kent, England
- Heckmondwike Grammar School, in West Yorkshire, England
