= Waterloo Hydrogeologic =

Waterloo Hydrogeologic is a company that specializes with groundwater modelling software, training, and consulting services. The company was started by Nilson Guiguer and Thomas Franz, who were developing software for their research at the University of Waterloo in 1988. The company was later founded in 1989 as Waterloo Hydrogeologic Software (WHS). The company first released FLOWPATH, which—at the time—was the first fully integrated graphical groundwater modelling software. In the fall of 1993, Waterloo Hydrogeologic became incorporated (changing their name to Waterloo Hydrogeologic Inc or WHI) and started with the development of Visual MODFLOW. The company diversified into groundwater software training and consulting services, as it expanded.

On January 10, 2005, Waterloo Hydrogeologic was acquired by Schlumberger's Water Services Technology Group and operated under the legal name Schlumberger Canada Limited, Waterloo Hydrogeologic Division.

On March 13, 2015, Waterloo Hydrogeologic was acquired by Nova Metrix, LLC, and currently operates under the legal name Nova Metrix Ground Monitoring (Canada), Ltd. Waterloo Hydrogeologic Division.

== See also ==
- Dimensional Insight
- ScienceSoft USA Corporation
