= Visual MODFLOW =

- Developer: Waterloo Hydrogeologic
- Initial release: August 1994; 31 years ago
- Stable release: 4.0 / December 2016; 8 years ago
- Written in: C# .NET
- Operating system: Microsoft Windows
- Available in: English, Chinese
- Type: Hydrogeology software
- License: Proprietary
- Website: www.waterloohydrogeologic.com/visual-modflow-flex/

Visual MODFLOW (VMOD) is a graphical interface (GUI) for the open source groundwater modeling engine MODFLOW. VMOD was developed by Waterloo Hydrogeologic and first released in 1994, the first commercially available GUI for MODFLOW. In May 2012 a .NET version of the software was rebranded as Visual MODFLOW Flex. The program includes proprietary extensions, such as MODFLOW-SURFACT, MT3DMS (mass-transport 3D multi-species) and a three-dimensional model explorer. Visual MODFLOW supports MODFLOW-2000, MODFLOW-2005, MODFLOW-NWT, MODFLOW-LGR, MODFLOW-SURFACT, and SEAWAT.

The software is used primarily by hydrogeologists to simulate groundwater flow and contaminant transport.

== History ==
The original version of Visual MODFLOW, developed for MS-DOS by Nilson Guiguer, Thomas Franz and Bob Cleary, was released in August 1994. It was based on the USGS MODFLOW-88 and MODPATH code, and resembled the FLOWPATH program developed by Waterloo Hydrogeologic Inc. The first Windows based version was released in 1997. The main programmers were Sergei Schmakov, Alexander Liftshits, and Sean Wilson. A .NET version that included non-grid-based, graphical conceptual modelling features was released in 2012.

On January 10, 2005, Waterloo Hydrogeologic was acquired by Schlumberger's Water Services Technology Group.

On May 1, 2012, Waterloo Hydrogeologic released Visual MODFLOW Flex.

On March 13, 2015, Waterloo Hydrogeologic was acquired by Nova Metrix.
