= FEHM =

Groundwater model

FEHM is a groundwater model that has been developed in the Earth and Environmental Sciences Division at Los Alamos National Laboratory over the past 30 years. The executable is available free at the FEHM Website. The capabilities of the code have expanded over the years to include multiphase flow of heat and mass with air, water, and CO_{2}, methane hydrate, plus multi-component reactive chemistry and both thermal and mechanical stress. Applications of this code include simulations of: flow and transport in basin scale groundwater systems , migration of environmental isotopes in the vadose zone, geologic carbon sequestration, oil shale extraction, geothermal energy, migration of both nuclear and chemical contaminants, methane hydrate formation, seafloor hydrothermal circulation, and formation of karst. The simulator has been used to generate results for more than 100 peer reviewed publications which can be found at FEHM Publications.

== Abstract ==
The Subsurface Flow and Transport Team at the Los Alamos National Laboratory (LANL) has been involved in large scale projects including performance assessment of Yucca Mountain, Environmental Remediation of the Nevada Test Site, the LANL Groundwater Protection Program and geologic CO_{2} sequestration. Subsurface physics has ranged from single fluid/single phase fluid flow when simulating basin scale groundwater aquifers to multi-fluid/multi-phase fluid flow when simulating the movement of air and water (with boiling and condensing) in the unsaturated zone surrounding a potential nuclear waste storage facility. These and other projects have motivated the development of software to assist in both scientific discovery and technical evaluation. LANL's FEHM (Finite Element Heat and Mass) computer code simulates complex coupled subsurface processes as well flow in large and geologically complex basins. Its development has spanned several decades; a time over which the art and science of subsurface flow and transport simulation has dramatically evolved. For most early researchers, models were used primarily as tools for understanding subsurface processes. Subsequently, in addition to addressing purely scientific questions, models were used in technical evaluation roles. Advanced model analysis requires a detailed understanding of model errors (numerical dispersion and truncation) as well as those associated with the application (conceptual and calibration) Application errors are evaluated through exploration of model and parameter sensitivities and uncertainties. The development of FEHM has been motivated subsurface physics of applications and also by the requirements of model calibration, uncertainty quantification, and error analysis. FEHM possesses unique features and capabilities that are of general interest to the subsurface flow and transport community and it is well suited to hydrology, geothermal, petroleum reservoir applications, and CO_{2} sequestration.

== Commercialization ==
Recently FEHM has been embedded into SVOFFICE™5/WR from SoilVision Systems Ltd, a GUI driven water resources numerical modeling framework. This marriage of GUI functionality with powerful underlying solvers and complex physics is leading to a new generation of capabilities with applications to a range of hydrogeological problems. Details can be found at the SoilVision SVOFFICE™5/WR website

== See also ==
- Aquifer
- Hydrogeology
- Groundwater
- Groundwater flow equation
- Groundwater energy balance
- Watertable control
- Groundwater drainage by wells
- Salinity model
