= FEFLOW =

- Original author(s): Hans-Jörg G. Diersch
- Developer(s): DHI Group
- Operating system: Linux, Microsoft Windows
- Type: FEM software
- License: proprietary
- Website: www.feflow.com

FEFLOW (Finite Element subsurface FLOW system) is a computer program for simulating groundwater flow, mass transfer and heat transfer in porous media and fractured media. The program uses finite element analysis to solve the groundwater flow equation of both saturated and unsaturated conditions as well as mass and heat transport, including fluid density effects and chemical kinetics for multi-component reaction systems.

== History ==
The software was firstly introduced by Hans-Jörg G. Diersch in 1979, see and. He developed the software in the Institute of Mechanics of the German Academy of Sciences Berlin up to 1990. In 1990 he was one of the founders of WASY GmbH of Berlin, Germany (the acronym WASY translates from German to Institute for Water Resources Planning and Systems Research), where FEFLOW has been developed further, continuously improved and extended as a commercial simulation package. In 2007 the shares of WASY GmbH were purchased by DHI. The WASY company has been fused and FEFLOW became part of the DHI Group software portfolio. FEFLOW is being further developed at DHI by an international team. Software distribution and services are worldwide.

== Technology ==
The program is offered in both 32-bit and 64-bit versions for Microsoft Windows and Linux operating systems.

FEFLOW's theoretical basis is fully described in the comprehensive FEFLOW book. It covers a wide range of physical and computational issues in the field of porous/fractured-media modeling. The book starts with a more general theory for all relevant flow and transport phenomena on the basis of the continuum mechanics, systematically develops the basic framework for important classes of problems (e.g., multiphase/multispecies non-isothermal flow and transport phenomena, variably saturated porous media, free-surface groundwater flow, aquifer-averaged equations, discrete feature elements), introduces finite element methods for solving the basic multidimensional balance equations, in detail discusses advanced numerical algorithms for the resulting nonlinear and linear problems, and completes with a number of benchmarks, applications and exercises to illustrate the different types of flow, mass and heat transport problems (e.g., subsurface flow and seepage problems, unsaturated-saturated flow, advective-diffusion transport, saltwater intrusion, geothermal and thermohaline flow).

== Other groundwater simulators ==
- MODFLOW
- Groundwater Modeling System
- MARTHE
- HydroGeoSphere
- HYDRUS
- SPRING (Simulation of Processes in Groundwater)
- PORFLOW
- MicroFEM LT
- OpenGeoSys
- Leapfrog Hydro
- ECLIPSE simulator with the H_{2}O extension

== Peer review ==
- Trefry, M.G.; Muffels, C. (2007). "FEFLOW: a finite-element ground water flow and transport modeling tool". Ground Water. 45 (5): 525–528. doi:10.1111/j.1745-6584.2007.00358.x. S2CID 131699137.
