= AstroTurf =

Brand of artificial turf

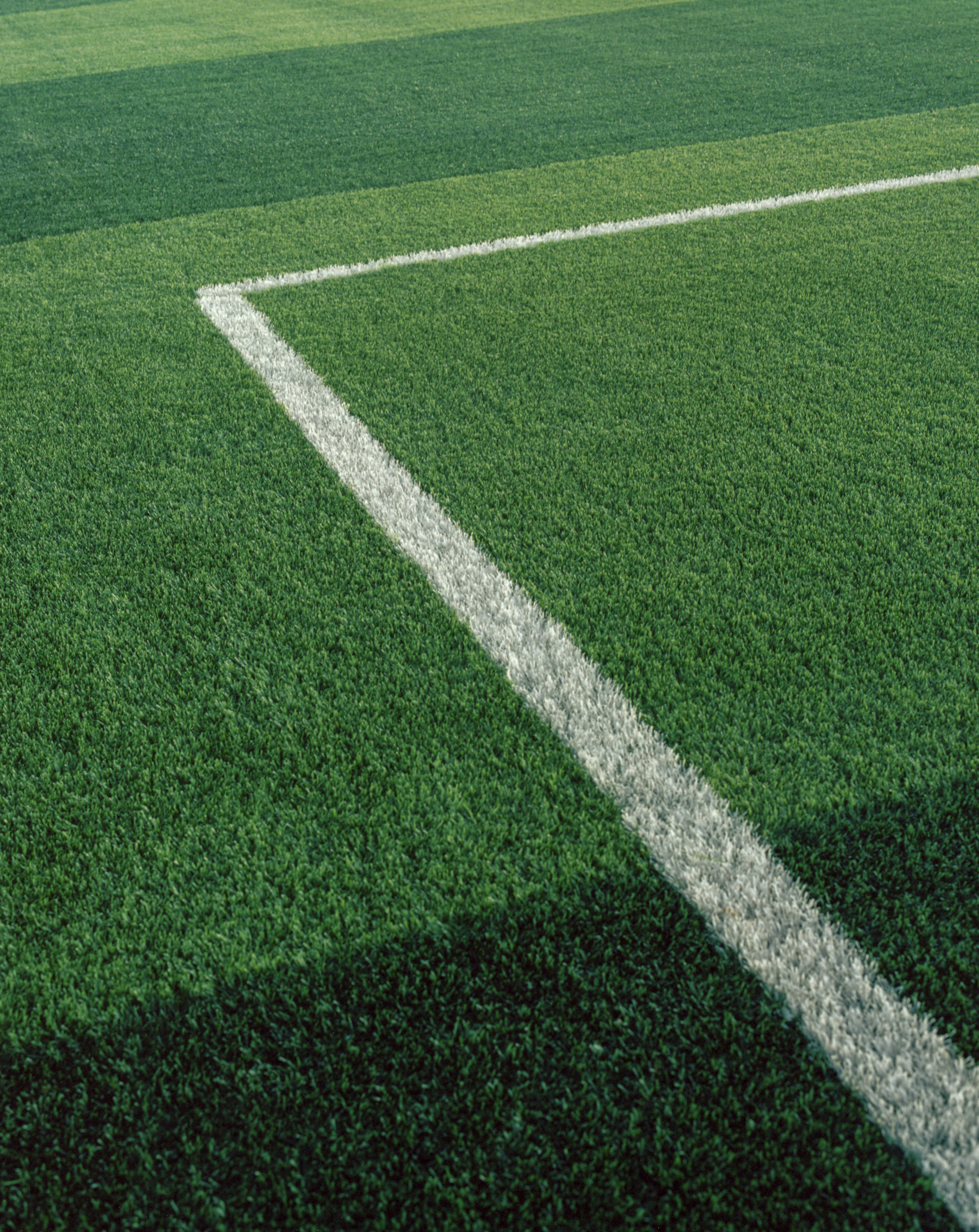
- Type: Subsidiary
- Founded: 1964; 62 years ago
- Headquarters: Dalton, Georgia, United States
- Key people: Robb Carey (CEO); Philip Snider (COO)
- Parent: SportGroup
- Website: AstroTurf.com

AstroTurf is an American subsidiary of SportGroup that produces artificial turf for playing surfaces in sports. The original AstroTurf product was a short-pile synthetic turf invented in 1965 by Monsanto. Since the early 2000s, AstroTurf has marketed taller pile systems that use infill materials to better replicate natural turf. In 2016, AstroTurf became a subsidiary of German-based SportGroup, a family of sports surfacing companies, which itself is owned by the investment firm Equistone Partners Europe.

== History ==
The original AstroTurf brand product was invented by James M. Faria and Robert T. Wright at Monsanto. The original, experimental installation was inside the Waughhtel-Howe Field House at the Moses Brown School in Providence, Rhode Island, in 1964. It was patented in 1965 and originally sold under the name "ChemGrass." It was rebranded as AstroTurf by company employee John A. Wortmann after its first well-publicized use at the Houston Astrodome stadium in 1966. Donald L. Elbert patented two methods to improve the product in 1971.

Early iterations of the short-pile turf swept many major stadiums, but the product did need improvement. Concerns over directionality and traction led Monsanto's R&D department to implement a texturized nylon system. By imparting a crimped texture to the nylon after it was extruded, the product became highly uniform.

In 1987, Monsanto consolidated its AstroTurf management, marketing, and technical activities in Dalton, Georgia, as AstroTurf Industries, Inc. In 1988, Balsam AG purchased all the capital stock of AstroTurf Industries, Inc. In 1994, Southwest Recreational Industries, Inc. (SRI) acquired the AstroTurf brand. In 1996, SRI was acquired by American Sports Products Group Inc.

While AstroTurf was the industry leader throughout the late 20th century, other companies emerged in the early 2000s. FieldTurf, AstroTurf's chief competitor since the early 2000s, marketed a product of tall-pile polyethylene turf with infill, meant to mimic natural grass more than the older products. This third-generation turf, as it became known, changed the landscape of the marketplace. SRI successfully marketed its own third-generation turf product named AstroPlay, and the resultant increased competition led to lawsuits. In 2000, SRI was awarded $1.5 million in a lawsuit after FieldTurf was deemed to have lied to the public by making false statements regarding its own product and making false claims about AstroTurf and AstroPlay products.

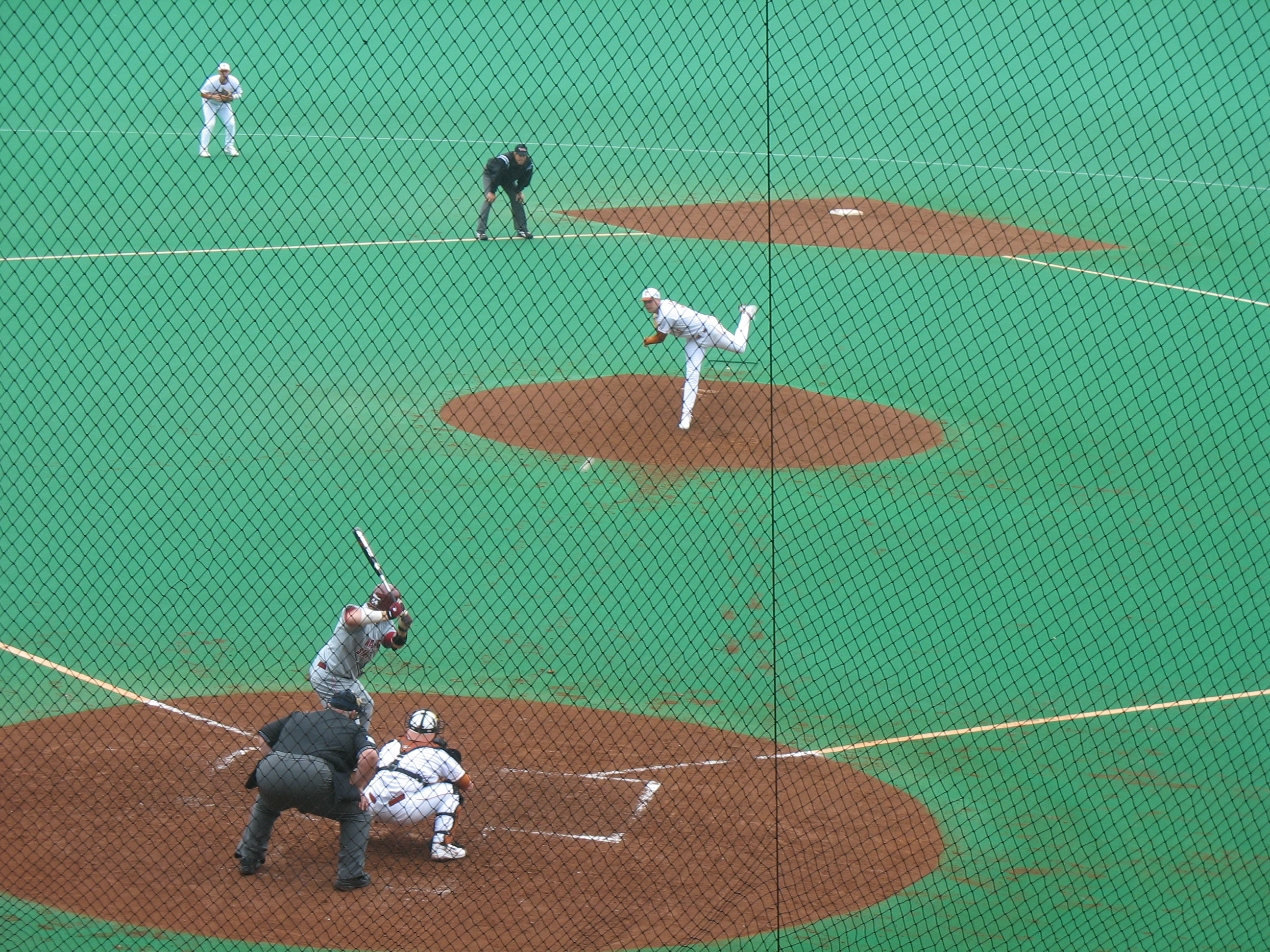
UFCU Disch–Falk Field in Texas, utilizing an older-style AstroTurf surface that has since been replaced

Despite their legal victory, increased competition took its toll. In 2004, SRI declared bankruptcy. Out of the bankruptcy proceedings, Textile Management Associates, Inc. (TMA) of Dalton, Georgia, acquired the AstroTurf brand and other assets. TMA began marketing the AstroTurf brand under the company AstroTurf, LLC. In 2006, General Sports Venue (GSV) became TMA's marketing partner for the AstroTurf brand for the American market. AstroTurf, LLC handled the marketing of AstroTurf in the rest of the world.

In 2009, TMA acquired GSV to enter the marketplace as a direct seller. AstroTurf, LLC focused its efforts on research and development, which has promoted rapid growth. AstroTurf introduced new product features and installation methods, including AstroFlect (a heat-reduction technology) and field prefabrication (indoor, climate-controlled inlaying). AstroTurf also introduced a product called "RootZone" consisting of crimped fibers designed to encapsulate infill.

In 2016, SportGroup Holding announced that it would purchase AstroTurf, along with its associated manufacturing facilities. The AstroTurf brand has operated since then in North America as AstroTurf Corporation.

In August 2021, AstroTurf became the official supplier of artificial turf to the United Soccer League, who run soccer leagues at the second, third, and fourth tiers of the U.S. men's soccer pyramid and the second tier of the U.S. women's soccer pyramid.

=== 1960s ===
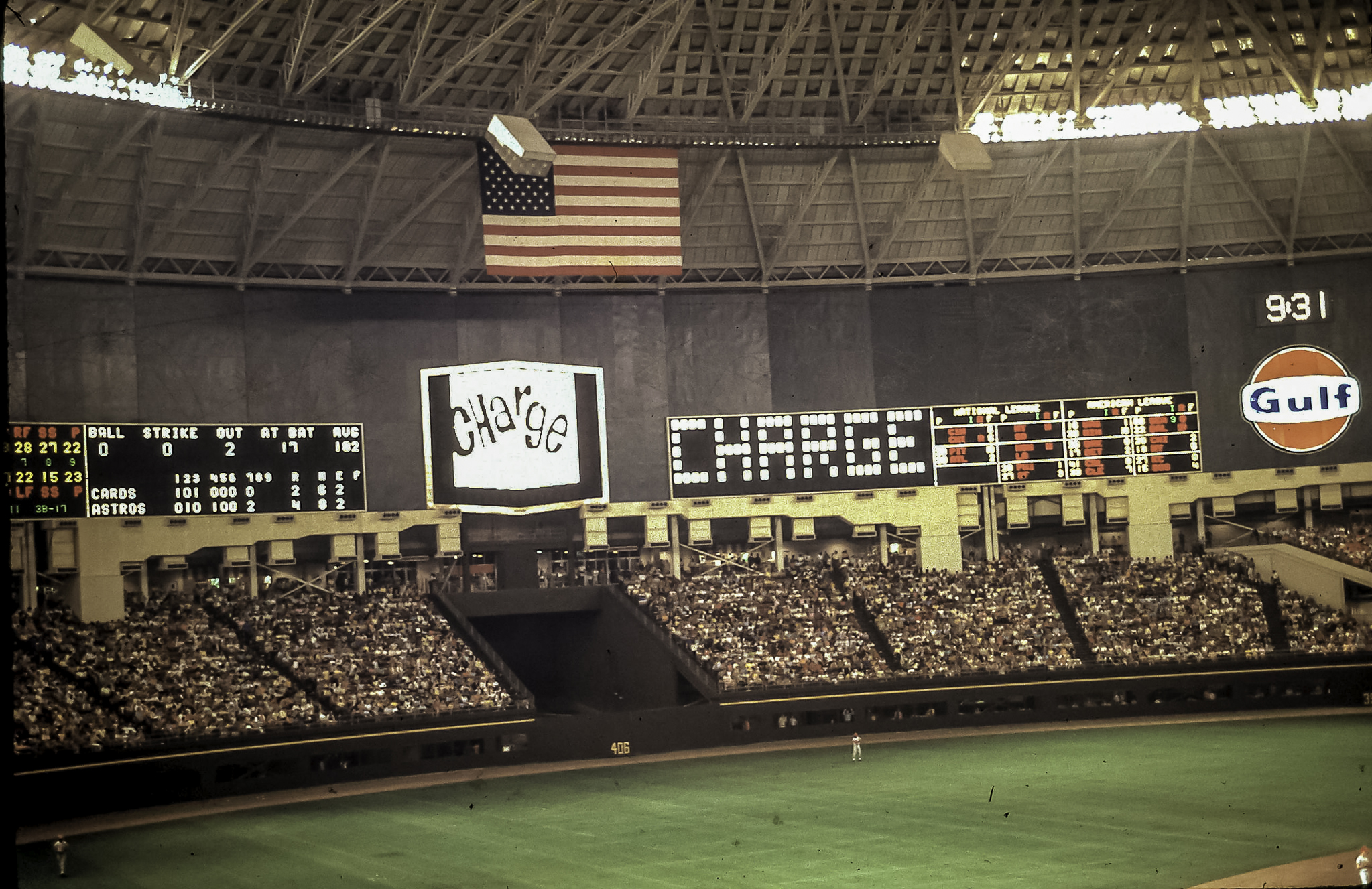
AstroTurf (pictured in the outfield) inside the Houston Astrodome during a June 7, 1969, contest between the Houston Astros and St. Louis Cardinals

1964

- The Moses Brown School in Providence, Rhode Island, installs ChemGrass.

1966

- First major installation of AstroTurf (ChemGrass) at the Houston Astrodome indoor stadium for the Houston Astros. The infield portion was in place before opening day in April; the outfield was installed in early summer.
- First college football game on artificial turf is played Sept. 23 in the Astrodome, Houston vs. Washington State.

1967

- AstroTurf is first installed in an outdoor stadium—Memorial Stadium at Indiana State University in Terre Haute.

1968

- AstroTurf manufacturing facility opens in Dalton, Georgia.
- First professional football game on artificial turf is played Sept. 9 at the Astrodome between the Houston Oilers and Kansas City Chiefs of the American Football League.

1969

- The backyard of The Brady Bunch house between the service porch and garage and under Tiger's kennel is covered with AstroTurf. According to script development notes, the installation firm hired by Mike Brady to lay the turf was owned by his college roommate, who had just started a landscaping business after returning from a combat tour in the Vietnam War with the 18th Engineer Brigade. In keeping with studio instructions, no direct mention of the war in Vietnam appeared in the script. The scene in which the installation takes place was ultimately cut, so never appeared in the series.
- AstroTurf is installed at Franklin Field at the University of Pennsylvania. The first National Football League game on artificial turf, the Philadelphia Eagles vs. the Cleveland Browns, is played Sept. 21.

=== 1970s ===
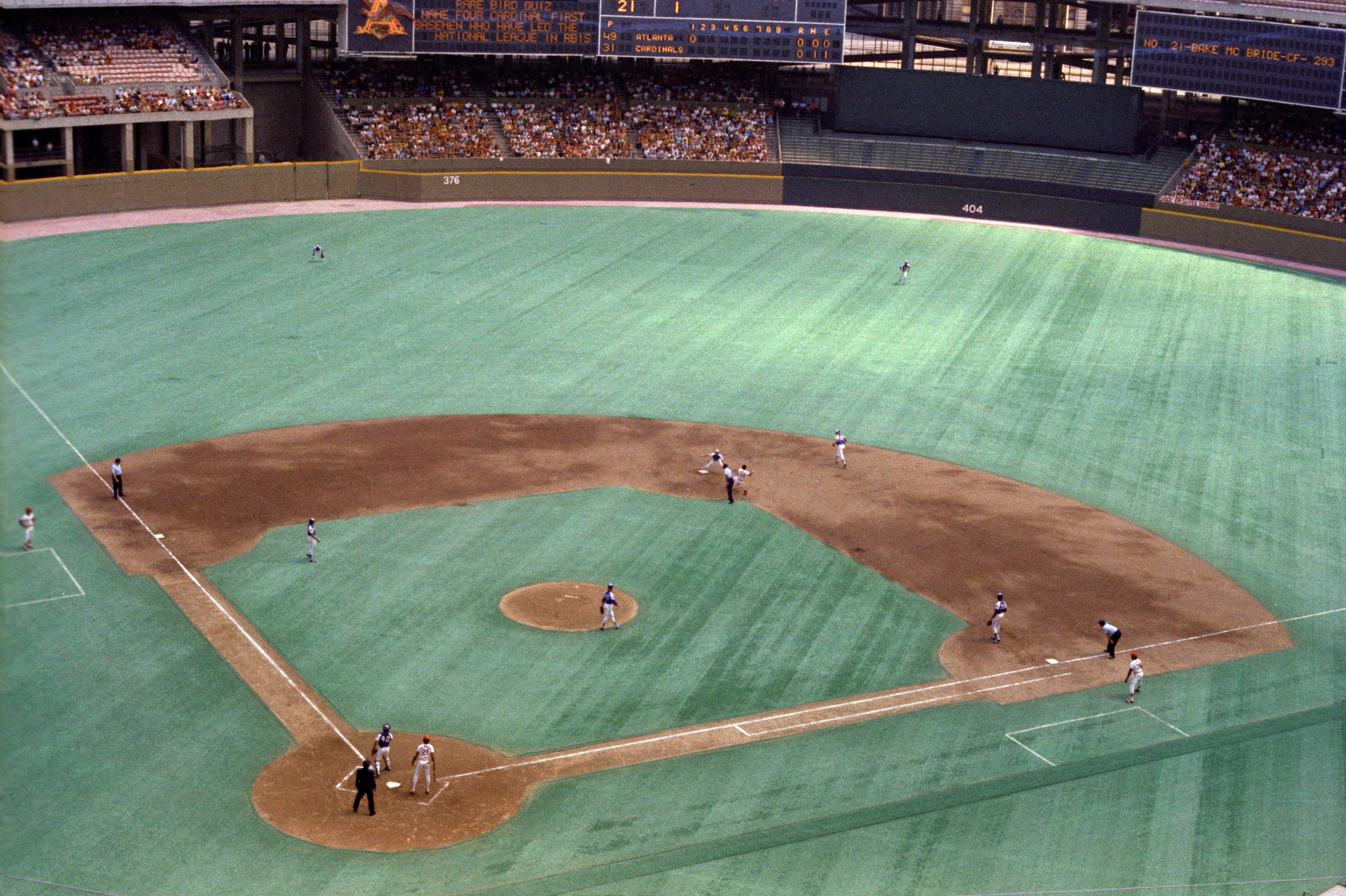
AstroTurf installed at Busch Stadium in St. Louis (photo taken in 1975)

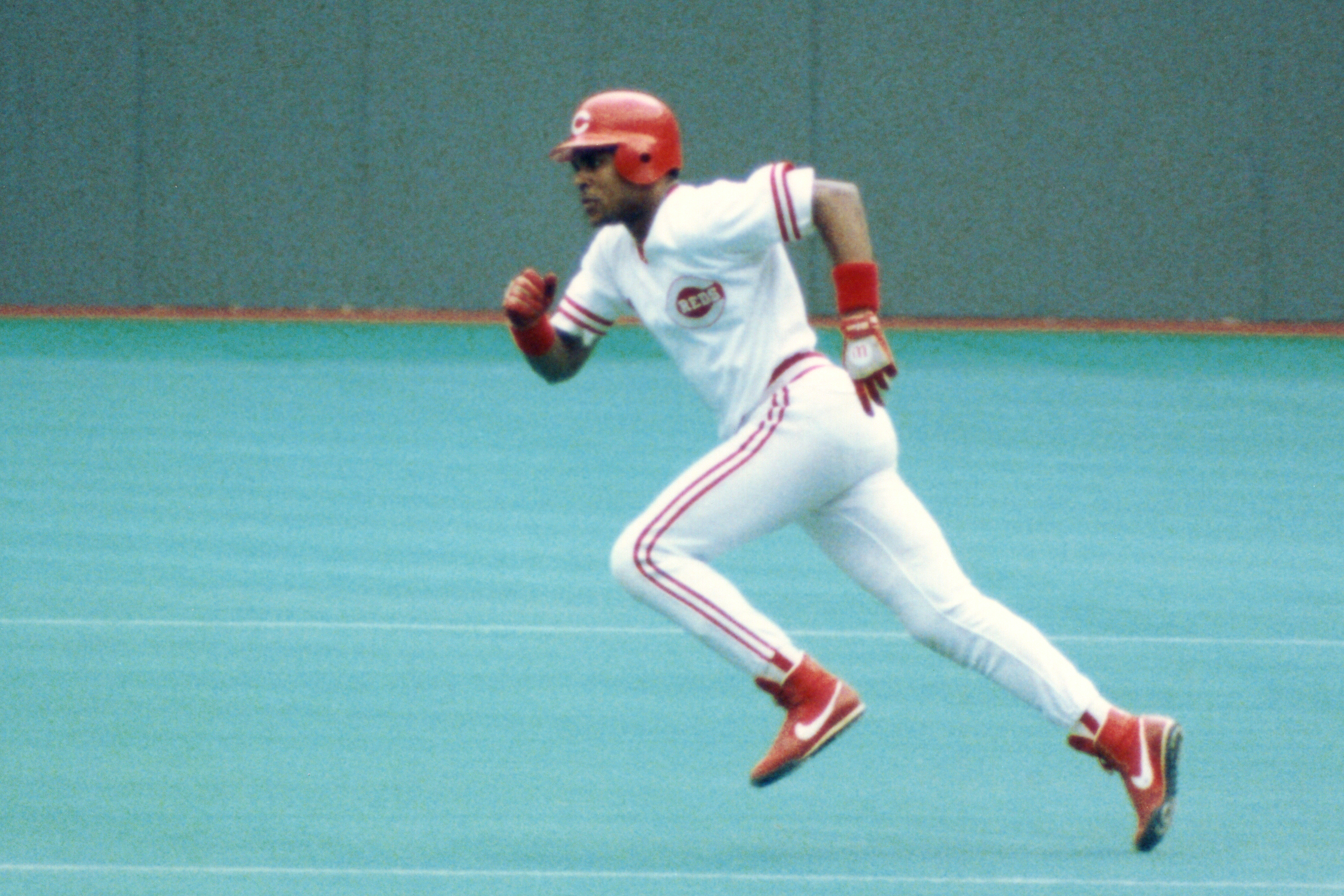
Cincinnati Reds shortstop Barry Larkin playing on AstroTurf at Riverfront Stadium, October 1990

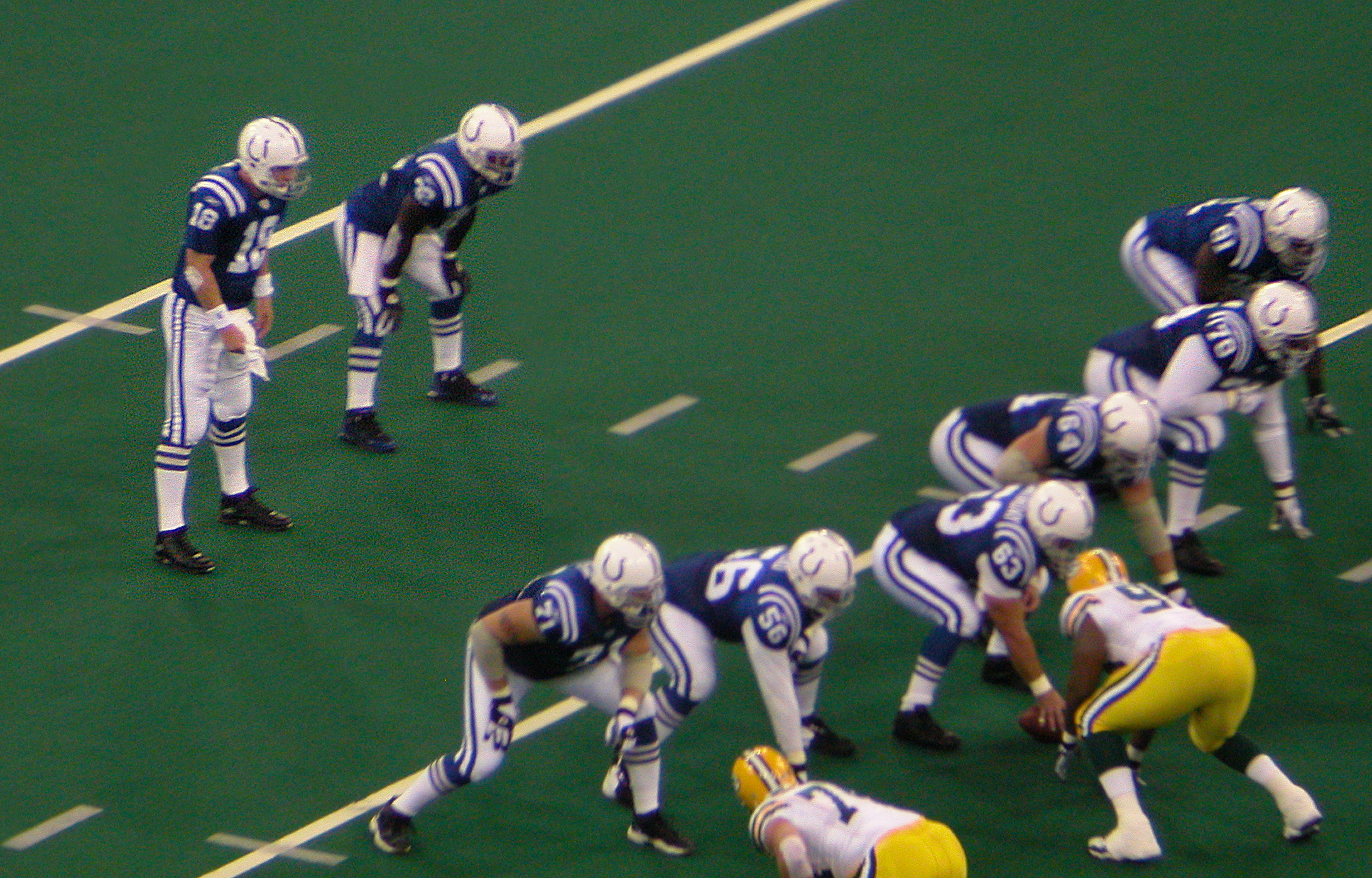
The Indianapolis Colts lining up for a play (on AstroTurf) against the Green Bay Packers in 2004 at the RCA Dome

1970

- The 1970 World Series is the first with games on AstroTurf (previously installed at Cincinnati's Riverfront Stadium), as the Reds play the Baltimore Orioles.

1971

- The CFL's Hamilton Tiger-Cats install AstroTurf at their home stadium, Ivor Wynne Stadium, in preparation for hosting the Grey Cup game the following year.

1972

- The Kansas City Chiefs home field of Arrowhead Stadium and the Kansas City Royals home field of Royals Stadium (now Kauffman Stadium) open in Kansas City, Missouri, with AstroTurf playing surfaces.

1973

- The Buffalo Bills' home field of Rich Stadium (later Ralph Wilson Stadium, and then Highmark Stadium) opens in Orchard Park, New York, with an AstroTurf playing surface.

1974

- The Miami Dolphins face the Minnesota Vikings on AstroTurf (the first Super Bowl played on the surface, but not the first to be played on artificial turf; that was Super Bowl V (in 1971) with Poly-Turf) in Super Bowl VIII – Rice Stadium, Houston, Texas.

1975

- The first international field hockey game is played on AstroTurf at Molson Stadium, Montreal.

=== 1980s ===
1980

- The Philadelphia Phillies and Kansas City Royals play the entire 1980 World Series on AstroTurf in their ballparks.

1984

- AstroTurf installs the first North American vertical drainage systems in Ewing, New Jersey, at Trenton State College (now known as The College of New Jersey).

1985

- The St. Louis Cardinals and Kansas City Royals play the entire 1985 World Series on AstroTurf in their ballparks.

1987

- The St. Louis Cardinals and Minnesota Twins play the entire 1987 World Series on AstroTurf in their ballparks.

1989

- The first E-Layer system (Elastomeric) is installed at the College of William & Mary, as well as the University of California, Berkeley.

=== 1990s ===
1993

- The 1993 World Series, between the Philadelphia Phillies and Toronto Blue Jays, was the fourth World Series to be played entirely on artificial turf, following those in 1980, 1985, and 1987.

1999

- Real Madrid C.F. (Spain) becomes the first European football club to purchase an AstroTurf system for their practice fields.
