= MODFLOW =

Groundwater simulation software

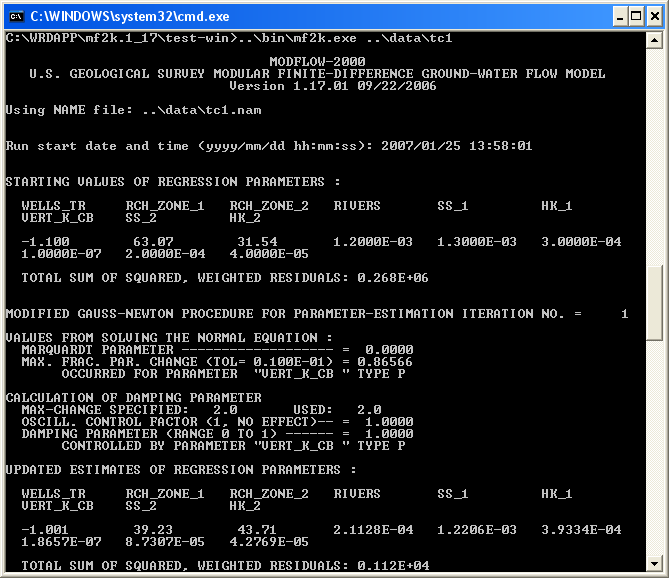
MODFLOW simulation

MODFLOW is the U.S. Geological Survey modular finite-difference flow model, which is a computer code that solves the groundwater flow equation. The program is used by hydrogeologists to simulate the flow of groundwater through aquifers. The source code is free public domain software, written primarily in Fortran, and can compile and run on Microsoft Windows or Unix-like operating systems. The compiled program is a command line tool that reads text file inputs that define the model grid, boundary conditions, and simulation time frame. Extensions beyond the command line program are several actively developed commercial and non-commercial graphical user interfaces.

== Groundwater flow equation ==
The governing partial differential equation for a confined aquifer used in MODFLOW is:

$$\frac{\partial}{\partial x} \left[ K_{xx} \frac{\partial h}{\partial x} \right] + \frac{\partial}{\partial y} \left[ K_{yy} \frac{\partial h}{\partial y} \right] + \frac{\partial}{\partial z} \left[ K_{zz} \frac{\partial h}{\partial z} \right] + W = S_{S} \frac{\partial h}{\partial t}$$

where

- $K_{xx}$, $K_{yy}$ and $K_{zz}$ are the values of hydraulic conductivity along the x, y, and z coordinate axes (L/T)
- $h$ is the potentiometric head (L)
- $W$ is a volumetric flux per unit volume representing sources and/or sinks of water, where negative values are extractions, and positive values are injections (T^{−1})
- $S_{S}$ is the specific storage of the porous material (L^{−1}); and
- $t\,$ is time (T)

=== Finite difference ===
The finite difference form of the partial differential in a discretized aquifer domain (represented using rows, columns and layers) is:

$$\begin{align}
& \mathit{CR}_{i,j-\tfrac{1}{2},k}\left(h^m_{i,j-1,k}-h^m_{i,j,k}\right) +
\mathit{CR}_{i,j+\tfrac{1}{2},k}\left(h^m_{i,j+1,k}-h^m_{i,j,k}\right) + \\
& \mathit{CC}_{i-\tfrac{1}{2},j,k}\left(h^m_{i-1,j,k}-h^m_{i,j,k}\right) +
\mathit{CC}_{i+\tfrac{1}{2},j,k}\left(h^m_{i+1,j,k}-h^m_{i,j,k}\right) + \\
& \mathit{CV}_{i,j,k-\tfrac{1}{2}}\left(h^m_{i,j,k-1}-h^m_{i,j,k}\right) +
\mathit{CV}_{i,j,k+\tfrac{1}{2}}\left(h^m_{i,j,k+1}-h^m_{i,j,k}\right) + \\
& P_{i,j,k}\,h^m_{i,j,k} + Q_{i,j,k} = \mathit{SS}_{i,j,k}\left(\Delta r_j \Delta c_i \Delta v_k\right)
\frac{h^m_{i,j,k}-h^{m-1}_{i,j,k}}{t^m-t^{m-1}}
\end{align}$$

where

$h^m_{i,j,k}\,$ is the hydraulic head at cell i,j,k at time step m
CV, CR and CC are the hydraulic conductances, or branch conductances between node i,j,k and a neighboring node
$P_{i,j,k}\,$ is the sum of coefficients of head from source and sink terms
$Q_{i,j,k}\,$ is the sum of constants from source and sink terms, where $Q_{i,j,k}<0.0\,$ is flow out of the groundwater system (such as pumping) and $Q_{i,j,k}>0.0\,$ is flow in (such as injection)
$\mathit{SS}_{i,j,k}\,$ is the specific storage
$\Delta r_j\Delta c_i\Delta v_k\,$ are the dimensions of cell i,j,k, which, when multiplied, represent the volume of the cell; and
$t^m\,$ is the time at time step m

This equation is formulated into a system of equations to be solved as:

$$\begin{align}
&\mathit{CV}_{i,j,k-\tfrac{1}{2}} h^m_{i,j,k-1} +
\mathit{CC}_{i-\tfrac{1}{2},j,k} h^m_{i-1,j,k} +
\mathit{CR}_{i,j-\tfrac{1}{2},k} h^m_{i,j-1,k} \\
&+ \left(
- \mathit{CV}_{i,j,k-\tfrac{1}{2}} - \mathit{CC}_{i-\tfrac{1}{2},j,k} - \mathit{CR}_{i,j-\tfrac{1}{2},k}
- \mathit{CR}_{i,j+\tfrac{1}{2},k} - \mathit{CC}_{i+\tfrac{1}{2},j,k} - \mathit{CV}_{i,j,k+\tfrac{1}{2}}
+ \mathit{HCOF}_{i,j,k}\right)     h^m_{i,j,k} \\
&+ \mathit{CR}_{i,j+\tfrac{1}{2},k} h^m_{i,j+1,k}
+ \mathit{CC}_{i+\tfrac{1}{2},j,k} h^m_{i+1,j,k}
+ \mathit{CV}_{i,j,k+\tfrac{1}{2}} h^m_{i,j,k+1}
= \mathit{RHS}_{i,j,k}
\end{align}$$

where

$$\begin{align}
\mathit{HCOF}_{i,j,k} &=  P_{i,j,k} - \frac{\mathit{SS}_{i,j,k}\Delta r_j \Delta c_i \Delta_k}{t^m-t^{m-1}} \\
\mathit{RHS}_{i,j,k}  &= -Q_{i,j,k} - \mathit{SS}_{i,j,k}\Delta r_j \Delta c_i \Delta v_k \frac{h^{m-1}_{i,j,k}}{t^m-t^{m-1}}
\end{align}$$

or in matrix form as:

$$A\mathbf{h}=\mathbf{q}$$

where

A is a matrix of the coefficients of head for all active nodes in the grid
$\mathbf{h}$ is a vector of head values at the end of time step m for all nodes in the grid; and
$\mathbf{q}$ is a vector of the constant terms, RHS, for all nodes of the grid.

=== Limitations ===
- The water must have a constant density, dynamic viscosity (and consequently temperature) throughout the modelling domain (SEAWAT is a modified version of MODFLOW which is designed for density-dependent groundwater flow and transport)

$$\mathbf{K} = \begin{bmatrix} K_{xx} & 0 & 0 \\ 0 & K_{yy} & 0 \\ 0 & 0 & K_{zz}\end{bmatrix} \$$

- The principal components of anisotropy of the hydraulic conductivity used in MODFLOW is displayed on the right. This tensor does not allow non-orthogonal anisotropies, as could be expected from flow in fractures. Horizontal anisotropy for an entire layer can be represented by the coefficient "TRPY" (Data Item 3 Page 153).

== Versions ==
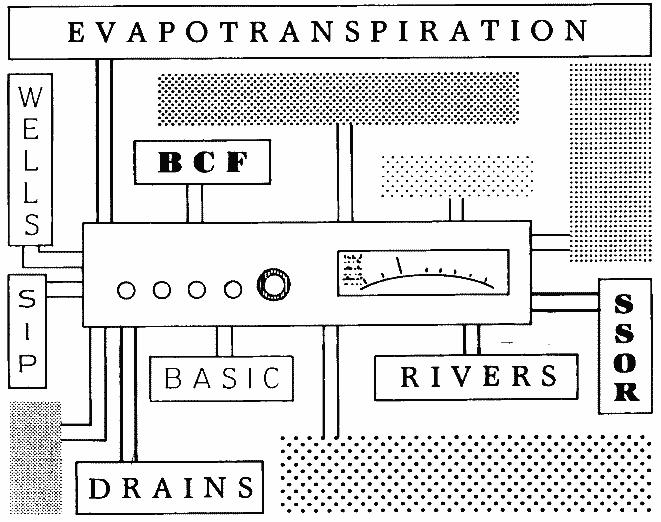
Cover image from McDonald & Harbaugh (1983), which illustrates a computer surrounded by modules and arrays used by MODFLOW. This was said at the time to resemble a "component stereo system".

=== "Modular Model" ===
The USGS throughout the 1970s had developed several hundred models, written in different dialects of FORTRAN. At the time, it was common practice to rewrite a new model to fit the need of a new groundwater scenario. The concept for MODFLOW was originally designed in 1981 to provide a common modular groundwater model, which could be compiled on multiple platforms without major (or any) modification, and can read and write common formats. Different aspects of the groundwater system would be handled using the modules, similar to the idea of a "component stereo system". The original name of the code was "The USGS Modular Three-Dimensional Finite-Difference Ground-Water Flow Model", or informally as "The Modular Model". The name MODFLOW was coined several years after the initial code development, which started in 1981.

The first version of MODFLOW was published on December 28, 1983, and was coded entirely in FORTRAN 66. The source code for this version is listed in USGS Open File Report 83-875 referred to above.

=== MODFLOW-88 ===
This version of MODFLOW was rewritten in FORTRAN 77, and was originally released on July 24, 1987. The current version of MODFLOW-88 is 2.6, released on September 20, 1996.

MODPATH, was initially developed in 1989 to post-process the steady-state MODFLOW-88 data to determine three-dimensional pathlines of particles. This innovation has been indispensable for the fields of contaminant hydrogeology. It is still used as a post-processor in recent versions of MODFLOW.

A separate program, MODFLOWP, was developed in 1992 to estimate various parameters used in MODFLOW. This program was eventually built into MODFLOW-2000.

=== MODFLOW-96 ===
MODFLOW-96 (version 3.0) was originally released on December 3, 1996, and is a cleaned-up and revised continuation of MODFLOW-88. There are three final releases of MODFLOW-96:

- MODFLOW-96 (version 3.3, May 2, 2000)
- MODFLOW-96h (version 3.3h, July 10, 2000), with HYDMOD package
- MODFLOWP (version 3.2, Oct 9, 1997), MODFLOW-96 with parameter-estimation

Several graphical interfaces were first developed using the MODFLOW-96 code.

=== MODFLOW-2000 ===
MODFLOW-2000 (version 1.0; version numbering was reset) was released on July 20, 2000, which merged MODFLOWP and HYDMOD codes into the main program and has integrated observation, sensitivity analysis, parameter estimation, and uncertainty evaluation capabilities. Many new packages and enhancements were also included, including new solvers, stream and saturated flow packages. The internal design concepts also changed from previous versions, such that packages, processes and modules are distinct. This version was coded in a mixture of FORTRAN 77, Fortran 90, and one solver was programmed in C. MODFLOW-2000 can also be compiled for parallel computing, which can allow multiple processors to be used to increase model complexity and/or reduce simulation time. The parallelization capability is designed to support the sensitivity analysis, parameter estimation, and uncertainty analysis capabilities of MODFLOW-2000.

The final version of MODFLOW-2000 (or MF2K) is version 1.19.01, released on March 25, 2010. There are four related or branched codes based on MODFLOW-2000:

- MF2K-GWM or GWM-2000 (version 1.1.4, May 31, 2011, branched from mf2k 1.17.2), with groundwater management capability using optimization
- MF2K-FMP (version 1.00, May 19, 2006, based on mf2k 1.15.03), with Farm Process
- MF2K-GWT (version 1.9.8, October 28, 2008, based on MF2K 1.17.02), groundwater flow and solute-transport model
- SEAWAT (version 4.00.05, October 19, 2012), variable-density flow and transport processes
- VSF (version 1.01, July 5, 2006), variably saturated flow

=== MODFLOW-2005 ===
MODFLOW-2005 differs from MODFLOW-2000 in that the sensitivity analysis, parameter estimation, and uncertainty evaluation capabilities are removed. Thus, the support for these capabilities now falls to "clip on" codes that are supported externally to the MODFLOW support effort. In addition, the code was reorganized to support multiple models within one MODFLOW run, as needed for the LGR (Local Grid Refinement) capability. MODFLOW-2005 is written primarily in Fortran 90 and C, with C being used for one solver.

The current version of MODFLOW-2005 is version 1.12.00, released on February 3, 2017. Related or branched codes include:

- MODFLOW-CFP (version 1.8.00, February 23, 2011), conduit flow process to simulate turbulent or laminar groundwater flow conditions
- MODFLOW-LGR (version 2.0, September 19, 2013), local grid refinement
- GWM-2005 (version 1.4.2, March 25, 2013), groundwater management capability using optimization
- MF2005-FMP2 (version 1.0.00, October 28, 2009), estimate dynamically integrated supply-and-demand components of irrigated agriculture as part of the simulation of surface-water and ground-water flow
- MODFLOW-NWT(version 1.1.3, August 1, 2017), Newton formulation for solving problems involving drying and rewetting nonlinearities of the unconfined groundwater-flow equation.
- MODFLOW-OWHMv1 (version 1.00.12, October 1, 2016), The One-Water Hydrologic Flow Model (MF-OWHM1), developed cooperatively between the USGS and the U.S. Bureau of Reclamation, is a fusion of multiple versions of MODFLOW-2005 (NWT, LGR, FMP, SWR, SWI) into ONE version, contains upgrades and new features and allows the simulation of head-dependent flows, flow-dependent flows, and deformation dependent flows that collectively affect conjunctive use of water resources.
- MODFLOW-USG. All version of MODFLOW listed above are constructed on what is called a structured grid. That is, the grid is composed of rectilinear blocks. The only exception is the LGR capability, which allows locally refined grids to be inserted into the structure of a "parent" grid. The local area is again composed of rectilinear blocks, but the blocks are smaller. Experimentation with a much more flexible grid structure resulted in the release of MODFLOW-USG (version 1.3.00, December 1, 2015), designed to be adapted to a wide range of grid variations using unstructured grids. MODFLOW-USG has similar capabilities as MODFLOW 6, which provides grid capabilities with and intermediate level of flexibility.
- MODFLOW-USG Transport. An update of MODFLOW USG including multiple solute species transport, density dependent flow and transport, use of the Richard's equation for flow and transport in the unsaturated zone and air-water interface sorption. Some of the updates to the model have also been made to accommodate for transport of PFAS.

=== MODFLOW 6 ===
MODFLOW 6 (MF6), first released in 2017, is a complete redevelopment of MODFLOW-2005 following an object-oriented programming paradigm in Fortran. MF6 provides a platform that includes the capabilities from several previous MODFLOW-2005 versions, including MODFLOW-NWT, MODFLOW-USG, and MODFLOW-LGR. MODFLOW 6 supports structured or unstructured grids, has full support for the Newton-Raphson formulation, and has a unique Water Mover Package that allows flows to be routed between the advanced packages, including the Streamflow Routing, Lake, Multi-Aquifer Well, and Unsaturated Zone Flow Packages. MODFLOW 6 also contains a Groundwater Transport (GWT) model that simulates transient three-dimensional solute transport on structured or unstructured grids and through the advanced flow and mover packages. An Application Programming Interface (API) is also available for MODFLOW 6, which allows the program to be coupled with other models or controlled with popular scripting languages, such as Python. While there are a few features lacking in the current release that are supported in MODFLOW-2005, most of the popular capabilities in previous MODFLOW versions are available in MODFLOW 6. The current version is 6.2.2, released July 30, 2021..

=== MODFLOW-OWHM Version 2 ===
The MODFLOW One-Water Hydrologic Flow Model version 2 (MF-OWHM) is a major rewrite of MF-OWHM1 released in 2020. MF-OWHM is a MODFLOW-2005 based integrated hydrologic model designed for the analysis of conjunctive-use management. The term “integrated” refers to the tight coupling of groundwater flow, surface-water flow, landscape processes, aquifer compaction and subsidence, reservoir operations, and conduit (karst) flow. This fusion results in a simulation software capable of addressing water-use and sustainability problems, including conjunctive-use, water-management, water-food-security, and climate-crop-water scenarios.

As a second core version of MODFLOW-2005, MF-OWHM maintains backward compatibility with existing MODFLOW-2005 versions. Existing models developed using MODFLOW-2005, MODFLOW-NWT, MODFLOW-SWI, MODFLOW-SWR, MODFLOW-LGR, and MODFLOW-CFP can also be simulated using MF-OWHM. The Farm Process (FMP) is part of MF-OWHM but is the only component that does not maintain input backward compatibility with past releases (see the FMP_Template for new input structure). MF-OWHM also includes a Surface Water Operations Module (SWO) with a Fortran-like scripting language, Slang, that can specify dynamic reservoir and stream operations. A current major application of MF-OWHM, developed by the USGS, is the California Central Valley (CVHM2).

The current USGS Approved Software version is 2.3.0 released on January 15, 2024, and the in-review preliminary release of 2.3.1 released on December 12, 2025.

== Packages ==
The names in this table are the labels used to turn MODFLOW capabilities on and off via a key input file. Most capabilities have many alternatives or can be omitted, but the ones related to the BASIC Package are always required. Many of the capabilities introduced are supported in later versions, though the grid change enabled with MODFLOW-USG and MODFLOW 6 meant that such backward compatibility was rather selective.

Name	Long name	Version introduced
Basic Package and its Components
BAS	Basic Package	original
OC	Output Control	original
DIS	Discretization	MODFLOW-2000 (1.0)
DISU	Unstructured Discretization	MODFLOW-USG (1.0)
DISV	Discretization by Vertices	MODFLOW 6 (1.00)
IC	Initial Conditions	MODFLOW 6 (1.00)
Groundwater flow packages
BCF	Block-Centered Flow Package	original
CLN	Connected Linear Network Process	MODFLOW-USG (1.0)
GNC	Ghost Node Correction Package	MODFLOW-USG (1.0)
HFB	Horizontal Flow Barrier Package	MODFLOW-88
HUF	Hydrogeologic Unit Flow Package	MODFLOW-2000 (1.1)
LPF	Layer-Property Flow Package	MODFLOW-2000 (1.0)
NPF	Node Property Flow	MODFLOW 6 (1.00)
SWI2	Seawater Intrusion Package	MODFLOW-2005 (1.11)
UPW	Upstream Weighting Package	MODFLOW-NWT (1.0)
UZF	Unsaturated-Zone Flow Package	MODFLOW-2005 (1.2)
Conjunctive Use and Land Use Simulation
FMP	Farm Process	MODFLOW-FMP
SWO	Surface Water Operations	MODFLOW-OWHM (2.0)
Specified Head boundary packages
CHD	Constant-Head Boundary / Time-Variant Specified-Head	MODFLOW-88
FHB	Flow and Head Boundary Package	MODFLOW-96 (3.2)
Specified flux boundary packages
FHB	Flow and Head Boundary Package	MODFLOW-96 (3.2)
RCH	Recharge Package	original
WEL	Well Package	original
Head-dependent flux boundary packages
DAF	DAFLOW	MODFLOW-96
DRN	Drain Package	original
DRT	Drain Return Package	MODFLOW-2000 (1.1)
ETS	Evapotranspiration Segments Package	MODFLOW-2000 (1.1)
EVT	Evapotranspiration Package	original
GHB	General-Head Boundary Package	original
LAK	Lake Package	MODFLOW-2000 (1.1)
MAW	Multi-Aquifer Well	MODFLOW 6 (1.00)
MNW	Multi-Node, Drawdown-Limited Well Package	MODFLOW-2000 (1.11)
RES	Reservoir Package	MODFLOW-88 (2.6)
RIP	Riparian Evapotranspiration Package	MODFLOW-OWHM (1.0)
RIV	River Package	original
SFR	Streamflow-Routing Package	MODFLOW-2000 (1.14.00)
STR	Stream Package	MODFLOW-88
SWR	Surface-Water Routing Process	MODFLOW-NWT 1.08
UZF	Unsaturated-Zone Flow Package	MODFLOW-2005 (1.2)
Solvers
DE4	Direct Solver Package	MODFLOW-88 (2.5)
GMG	Geometric Multigrid Solver	MODFLOW-2000 (1.15.00)
LMG	Link-AMG Package	MODFLOW-2000 (1.4) (Note: Due to licensing restrictions, the USGS is no longer able to publicly distribute the Algebraic Multi-Grid)
NWT	Newton-Raphson	MODFLOW-NWT (1.0)
PCG	Preconditioned Conjugate-Gradient Package	MODFLOW-88
PCGN	Preconditioned Conjugate Gradient Solver with Improved Nonlinear Control	MODFLOW-2005 (1.9.0)
SIP	Strongly Implicit Procedure Package	original
SMS	Sparse Matrix Solver	MODFLOW-USG (1.0)
SOR	Slice Successive Over-Relaxation Package	original
Miscellaneous packages
GAG	Gage	MODFLOW-2000
HYD	HYDMOD	MODFLOW-2000 (1.1)
IBS	Interbed-Storage	MODFLOW-88
KDEP	Hydraulic-Conductivity Depth-Dependence Capability	MODFLOW-2000 (1.12)
LMT	Link-MT3DMS	MODFLOW-2000 (1.5)
LVDA	Model-Layer Variable-Direction Horizontal Anisotropy Capability	MODFLOW-2000 (1.12)
MVR	Water Mover	MODFLOW 6 (1.00)
STO	Storage	MODFLOW 6 (1.00)
SUB	Subsidence and Aquifer-System Compaction	MODFLOW-2000 (1.12)
SWT	Subsidence and Aquifer-System Compaction Package for Water-Table Aquifers	MODFLOW-2000 (1.18)
CSUB	Skeletal Storage, Compaction, and Subsidence	MODFLOW 6 (6.1.0)
UTL	Utility	original
Observation process input files
OBS	Input File For All Observations	MODFLOW-2000
HOB	Head-Observation	MODFLOW-2000
DROB	Drain Observation	MODFLOW-2000
DTOB	Drain Return Observation	MODFLOW-2000
RVOB	River Observation	MODFLOW-2000
GBOB	General-Head-Boundary Observation	MODFLOW-2000
CHOB	Constant-Head Flow Observation	MODFLOW-2000
ADV	Advective-Transport Observation	MODFLOW-2000 (1.0)
STOB	Stream Observation	MODFLOW-2000
Obsolete packages
GFD	General Finite-Difference	MODFLOW-88 to 96
TLK	Transient Leakage	MODFLOW-88 to 96

== Graphical user interfaces ==
There are several graphical interfaces to MODFLOW, which often include the compiled MODFLOW code with modifications. These programs aid the input of data for creating MODFLOW models.

=== Non-commercial interfaces ===
Non-commercial MODFLOW versions are free, however, their licensing usually limit the use to non-profit educational or research purposes.

- ModelMuse is a grid-independent graphical user interface from the USGS for MODFLOW 6, MODPATH, SUTRA, and PHAST version 1.51. There are no license restrictions. The source code is included.
- FloPy is a Python package for creating, running, and post-processing MODFLOW-based models.
- MODFLOW-GUI – Made by the USGS: it is updated often to match the current USGS MODFLOW development. It supports MODFLOW-96, MODFLOW-2000, MODFLOW-2005, MODPATH, ZONEBUDGET, GWT, MT3DMS, SEAWAT, and GWM. Source code for MODFLOW-GUI is included. It depends on Argus ONE: a commercial interface for constructing generic models. There are no license restrictions beyond those of Argus ONE.
- PMWIN – "Processing MODFLOW" (for Windows) – powerful freeware for MODFLOW processing and visualization, provided alongside an instructional book; also available in Traditional Chinese. The license for this version is limited to non-commercial use.
- mflab - mflab is a MATLAB interface to MODFLOW. The user builds and analyzes models by writing a set of MATLAB scripts. This results in flexible and efficient workflows, allowing a great deal of automation.
- iMOD - Free and open source interface developed by Deltares. iMOD contains an accelerated version of MODFLOW with fast, flexible and consistent sub-domain modeling techniques. Facilitating large, high resolution MODFLOW modeling and geo-editing of the subsurface
- FREEWAT is a free and open source, QGIS-integrated modelling platform integrating MODFLOW (MODFLOW versions integrated are MODFLOW-2005 and MODFLOW-OWHM) and the following MODFLOW-related simulation codes: MT3DMS, MT3D-USGS, SEAWAT, ZONE BUDGET, MODPATH, UCODE-2014. FREEWAT has been developed in the framework of the H2020 FREEWAT project (FREE and open source software tools for WATer resource management), financed by the EU Commission under the call WATER INNOVATION: BOOSTING ITS VALUE FOR EUROPE. The source code is released under a GNU GENERAL PUBLIC LICENSE, Version 2, June 1991, along with a complete set of User Manuals and tutorials.

=== Commercial programs ===
Commercial MODFLOW programs are typically used by governments and consultants for practical applications of MODFLOW to real-world groundwater problems. Professional versions of MODFLOW are generally priced at a minimum of around $1000 and typically range upward to US$7000. This is a list of commercial programs for MODFLOW:

- Argus ONE
- GMS – Groundwater Modeling System
- Groundwater Vistas
- Leapfrog Hydro
- Processing Modflow
- Visual MODFLOW

All current versions of these programs run only on Microsoft Windows, however previous versions of GMS (up to Version 3.1) were compiled for several Unix platforms.

=== Former graphical interfaces ===
- Graphic Groundwater – Windows-based interface
- ModelCad – A Windows-based interface, developed by Geraghty and Miller, Inc.
- ModIME – MS-DOS-based interface by S.S. Papadopulos & Associates, Inc.

== See also ==
- FEFLOW
- PORFLOW
- HydroGeoSphere
- Hydrological optimization
- MIKE SHE
- MT3D
- Parflow
- MARTHE from the French Geological Survey (BRGM)
