= MT3D =

MT3D is a family of finite-difference groundwater mass transport modeling software, often used with MODFLOW. The first generation, MT3D, was developed by Chunmiao Zheng in 1990, and most recently released by the U.S. Geological Survey with MT3D-USGS.

== Versions ==
MT3D
Appeared in 1990.
MT3DMS
Second generation, released in 1998. Improved to simulate multiple species.
MT3D-USGS
Third generation, released in 2016. Improved to support new transport modeling capabilities from MODFLOW.
