= GMS (software) =

- Developer: Aquaveo
- Stable release: 10.7 / November 2022; 3 years ago
- Operating system: Microsoft Windows
- Type: Hydrogeology software
- License: Proprietary
- Website: Official website

GMS (Groundwater Modeling System) is water modeling application for building and simulating groundwater models from Aquaveo. It features 2D and 3D geostatistics, stratigraphic modeling and a unique conceptual model approach. Currently supported models include MODFLOW, MODPATH, MT3DMS, RT3D, FEMWATER, SEEP2D, and UTEXAS.

Version 6 introduced the use of XMDF (eXtensible Model Data Format), which is a compatible extension of HDF5. The purpose of this Is to allow internal storage and management of data in a single HDF file, rather than using many flat files.

== History ==
GMS was initially developed in the late 1980s and early 1990s on Unix workstations by the Engineering Computer Graphics Laboratory at Brigham Young University. The development of GMS was funded primarily by The United States Army Corps of Engineers and was known until version 4.0, released in late 1999, as the Department of Defense Groundwater Modeling System, or DoD GMS. It was ported to Microsoft Windows in the mid 1990s. Version 3.1 was the last version that supported HP-UX, IRIX, OSF/1, and Solaris platforms. Development of GMS, along with development of WMS and SMS, was transferred to Aquaveo when it was formed in April 2007.

A study published in the Journal of Agricultural and Applied Economics in August 2000 stated that "GMS provides an interface to the groundwater flow model, MODFLOW, and the contaminant transport model, MT3D. MODFLOW is a three-dimensional, cell-centered, finite-difference, saturated-flow model capable of both steady-state and transient analyses. These two models, when put together, provide a comprehensive tool for examining groundwater flow and nitrate transport and accumulation". The study was designed to help develop a "permit scheme to effectively manage nitrate pollution of groundwater supplies for communities in rural areas without hindering agricultural production in watersheds".

== Version history ==
Legend:
Unsupported
Supported
Latest version

GMS Release History
Date Released	Name	Version	Comments	References
December 1994	Department of Defense Groundwater Modeling System	1.0	Supported meshes, grids, geostats, MODFLOW (MODFLOW 88), and FEMWATER	
March 1995	Department of Defense Groundwater Modeling System	1.1	Support added for MT3D	
August 1995	Department of Defense Groundwater Modeling System	1.2		
June 1996	Department of Defense Groundwater Modeling System	2.0	Map module added, support added for conceptual modeling, MODPATH, and updates for FEMWATER	
March 1998	Department of Defense Groundwater Modeling System	2.1	Support added for SEEP2D and RT3D	
September 1999	Department of Defense Groundwater Modeling System	3.0	Support added for SEAM3D	
September 2000	Department of Defense Groundwater Modeling System	3.1	Standard Windows icons added to the GUI, support added for parameter estimation (PEST & UCODE), UTCHEM, MODFLOW-96, orthogonal view	
October 2002	GMS	4.0	Project Explorer added to GUI, cross section editor added, support added for stochastic modeling, horizons, MODFLOW-000, and T-PROGS	
January 2004	GMS	5.0	Support added for MODAEM	
	GMS	5.1	Support added for GIS, conceptual model objects, and coverage attribute tables	
July 2005	GMS	6.0	Support for OpenGL rendering, MODFLOW stored in files rather than in memory	
December 2007	GMS	6.5	First version released by Aquaveo. Support added for UTEXAS and HDF5	
August 2009	GMS	7.0	Compatible with Windows Vista. Support export in Arc Hydro Groundwater (AHGW) format, updated MODFLOW support, added support for MODPATH 5, removed ART3D interface	
February 2010	GMS	7.1	Updated MODFLOW package and UTEXAS feature support, added Parallel PEST (including SVD and SVD-Assist with PEST), changed GMS logo	
March 2011	GMS	8.0	Added support for MODFLOW-2005 and SEAWAT, updated MODFLOW-2000, MT3DMS, and T-PROGS support, improved OpenGL speed and general GUI	
September 2011	GMS	8.1	64-bit version of GMS released, improved speed of MODFLOW saving and importing, updated FEMWATER, annotations, and Global Mapper	
February 2012	GMS	8.2	Added support for ZONEBUDGET and MODFLOW NWT and DE4, major update to most models and libraries	
July 2012	GMS	8.3	Added feature allowing users to report bugs within GMS.	
November 2012	GMS	9.0	Current GMS logo released.	
May 2013	GMS	9.1		
November 2013	GMS	9.2		
July 2014	GMS	10.0		
February 2016	GMS	10.1		
October 2016	GMS	10.2		
August 2017	GMS	10.3		
November 2018	GMS	10.4		
November 2021	GMS	10.5		
January 2022	GMS	10.6		
November 2022	GMS	10.7		

== Reception ==
A 2001 report prepared for the Iowa Comprehensive Petroleum Underground Storage Tank Fund Board stated that GMS was "a very user-friendly software package with strong technical support." Raymond H. Johnson, a hydrogeologist with the US Geological Survey, called GMS 6.0 "a useful all around groundwater modeling package that offers the advantages of modular purchases, multiple model support, linkages to ArcGIS, conceptual model development, and integrated inversion routines." A 2006 report from the Center for Nuclear Waste Regulatory Analyses in San Antonio, Texas called GMS "the most sophisticated groundwater modeling software available".
