= UTEXAS =

Computer program

- UTEXAS4 Screen Shot
- Original author: Stephen G. Wright
- Stable release: 4.0
- Operating system: Microsoft Windows
- Available in: English
- Type: slope stability software
- License: Proprietary

UTEXAS is a slope stability analysis program written by Stephen G. Wright of the University of Texas at Austin. The program is used in the field of civil engineering to analyze levees, earth dams, natural slopes, and anywhere there is concern for mass wasting. UTEXAS finds the factor of safety for the slope and the critical failure surface. Recently the software was used to help determine the reasons behind the failure of I-walls during Hurricane Katrina.

== Methodology ==
UTEXAS uses the limit equilibrium method. The user provides the geometry and shear strength parameters for the slope in question and UTEXAS computes a factor of safety against slope failure. The factor of safety for a candidate failure surface is computed as the forces driving failure along the surface divided by the shear resistance of the soils along the surface.

UTEXAS employs a fast automatic search algorithm to find the failure surface with the lowest factor of safety with respect to shear strength. This is the critical failure surface. Alternatively an arbitrary surface can be entered by the user and UTEXAS can determine the factor of safety associated with it.

The factor of safety for a shear surface is determined using a procedure of slices. Several different procedures exist and the user can choose among them.

Input and output consist of text files. The geologic model is primarily defined using profile lines, which are lines defining the interface between different soil layers. Profile lines are associated with materials, and different materials with different properties can be defined.

== Features ==
The following is a list of some of the more distinct features of UTEXAS:

- Automatic Search Grid
- Multi-stage analysis
- Distributed loads
- Line loads
- Non-circular slip surfaces
- Interpolated pore pressures
- Internal soil reinforcement

== Version history ==
- UTEXAS5 - Currently under development
- UTEXAS4 - Released in 1999.
  - Translated into C++ from Fortran.
  - Microsoft Windows interface
  - Accompanied by TexGraf4 program for displaying results.
  - New features: lateral unit weight variation, import of pore water pressure from GMS/SEEP2D, more shear strength options, ability to contour factors of safety, tension cracks
- UTEXAS3 - Released in 1990.
  - First version with multi-stage analysis.
  - Accompanied by GRAPHICS3 program for displaying results.
  - New features: Multi-stage analysis.
- UTEXAS2 - Released in 1986.
  - First version written for PCs.
  - New features: Multiple limit equilibrium procedures, more ways to define shear strength, internal reinforcement, input data format improvements.
- UTEXAS - Released in 1984.
  - Successor to various programs written by Wright between 1969 and 1984
  - Features: Multiple piezometric surfaces, nonlinear shear strength envelope, simulation of seismic loading, noncircular slip surface search algorithm

== Related software ==
TexGraf4 screen shot

- TexGraf - Reads results from UTEXAS and displays them graphically. Also written by Wright
- UTEXASED4 - An educational version
- GMS – has a pre and post processor for UTEXAS
