= Head Gear System =

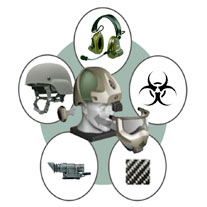
Artist's impression

The Head Gear System (HGS) is a future headgear ensemble under development by the U.S. Army. HGS attempts to integrate head protection against ballistics, fragmentation, blast, blunt force, flash heat, and noise into a single lightweight, modular, scalable headgear system. Program Executive Office (PEO) Soldier is working to develop a Soldier-centric Head Gear System (HGS) that provides ballistic and traumatic brain injury protection as well as face, neck, and hearing protection. The HGS also will incorporate integrated sensor inputs along with display hardware and software for increased situational awareness. The system will address technology gaps identified by the Capabilities Development Integration Directorate of the Army's Training and Doctrine Command.

== Design ==
The headgear system will be based on a modular platform for which protection levels and system enhancements can be added or removed based on mission requirements and/or predetermined threat assessments. HGS will be a lightweight, multifunctional system that protects Soldiers from wounds to the face and neck without degrading range of motion or mobility. Hearing protection will also be included. The system will monitor the degradation of a Soldier's ability to continue operations and will record exposure to blast events. Modular, integrated chemical, biological, radiological, and nuclear (CBRN) protection. Optimized sensor packages for use in all natural and man-made conditions, such as obscurants, will be included. The helmet system will be designed to be easily upgradeable.

== Development ==
The HGS development effort will mature, evaluate, integrate, and demonstrate technologies for improved system performance in the areas of ballistic and impact protection, hearing protection and hearing enhancement, video displays, audio and communications systems, training sensors, and CBRN capabilities, with the overarching goal of improving comfort and combat-effectiveness. The projected completion date for this initiative is FY12.

== See also ==
- Enhanced Combat Helmet
- Lightweight Helmet
- Advanced Combat Helmet
- Soldier Protection Demonstration
