= Integrated Water Flow Model =

Integrated Water Flow Model (IWFM) is a computer program for simulating water flow through the integrated land surface, surface water and groundwater flow systems. It is a rewrite of the abandoned software IGSM, which was found to have several programing errors. The IWFM programs and source code are freely available. IWFM is written in Fortran, and can be compiled and run on Microsoft Windows, Linux and Unix operating systems. The IWFM source code is released under the GNU General Public License.

Groundwater flow is simulated using the finite element method. Surface water flow can be simulated as a simple one-dimensional flow-through network or with the kinematic wave method. IWFM input data sets incorporate a time stamp, allowing users to run a model for a specified time period without editing the input files.

One of the most useful features of IWFM is the internal calculation of water demands for each land use type. IWFM simulates four land use classes: agricultural, urban, native vegetation, and riparian vegetation. Land use areas are delineated as a time series, with corresponding evapotranspiration rates and water management parameters. Each time step, the land use process applies precipitation, calculates infiltration and runoff, calculates water demands, and determines what portion of the demands are not met by soil moisture. For agricultural and urban land use classes, IWFM then applies surface water and groundwater at specified rates, and optionally adjusts surface water and groundwater to exactly meet water demands. This automatic adjustment feature is especially useful for calculating unmeasured flow components (such as groundwater withdrawals) or for simulating proposed future scenarios such as studying the impacts of potential climate change.

In IWFM, the land surface, surface water and groundwater flow domains are simulated as separate processes, compiled into individual dynamic link libraries. The processes are linked by water flow terms, maintain conservation of mass and momentum between processes, and are solved simultaneously. This allows each IWFM process to be run independently as a stand-alone model, or to be linked to other programs. This functionality has been used to create a Microsoft Excel Add-in to create workbooks from IWFM output files. The IWFM land surface process has been compiled into a stand-alone program called the IWFM Demand Calculator (IDC). The groundwater process is linked to the Water Resource Integrated Modeling System (WRIMS) modeling system and used in the water resources optimization model CalSim. This feature allows other models to be easily linked with IWFM, to either enhance the capabilities of the target model (for example, by adding groundwater flow to a land surface-surface water model) or to enhance the capabilities of IWFM (for example, linking an economic model to IWFM to dynamically change the crop mix based on the depth to groundwater, as the cost of pumping increases with depth to water).

Notable models developed with IWFM include the California Central Valley Groundwater-Surface Water Simulation Model (C2VSim), a model of the Walla-Walla Basin in Washington and Oregon, USA, a model of the Butte Basin, CA, USA, and several unpublished models. IWFM has also been peer reviewed.
