= ScienceSoft USA Corporation =

American IT consulting and software development company

ScienceSoft USA Corporation, doing business as ScienceSoft, is an international AI transformation and software development company headquartered in McKinney, Texas, USA and operating in the US, the Gulf Cooperation Council, and the EU.

== History ==
ScienceSoft USA Corporation originated in NILIM Cooperative (Scientific Research Laboratory of Inventive Machine), founded in 1989 by scientist Val Tsurikov. NILIM Cooperative studied artificial intelligence and created a technology of computer-aided invention, which simulated the process of human thinking on the basis of TRIZ (the theory of inventive problem-solving).

Starting in 1996, ScienceSoft developed semantic search, a project initially launched by NILIM Cooperative as part of a computer-aided invention solution. At first, ScienceSoft was an exclusive software development partner for its Invention Machine, but, in the early 2000s, Invention Machine was acquired by IHS Inc., driving ScienceSoft to change its business model.

In 2002, ScienceSoft USA Corporation was first engaged in IT outsourcing and custom software development, and became a fully independent business entity. Between 2006 and 2011, they collaborated with IBM. In 2007, ScienceSoft joined the Oracle Partner Network.

In 2017, ScienceSoft partnered with Magento and ServiceNow. In 2018, ScienceSoft USA Corporation was accredited with the Better Business Bureau and got an A+ rating from the organization.

In 2016, ScienceSoft became a Microsoft partner and has maintained the status of Microsoft Solution Partner since 2022.

In 2020, the company gained an AWS Select Tier Services Partner status.

In 2022, ScienceSoft USA Corporation became the winner of the 2022 Health Tech Digital Awards in the category of Best Healthcare Technology Solution. In 2022 and 2023, ScienceSoft USA Corporation was listed among The Americas’ Fastest-Growing Companies by the Financial Times. The same years, the International Association of Outsourcing Professionals (IAOP) mentioned ScienceSoft in its annual Global Outsourcing 100 list. In 2025, ScienceSoft became a Gold Member of the Healthcare Information and Management Systems Society (HIMSS).

== Activity ==
Offices

The company is headquartered in McKinney, Texas, USA, and has seven other locations worldwide:

- Vantaa, Finland
- Warsaw, Poland
- Riga, Latvia
- Atlanta, Georgia, USA
- Riyadh, Kingdom of Saudi Arabia
- Fujairah, United Arab Emirates

== Awards ==
From 2023 to 2025, ScienceSoft was listed among the Inc. 5000 list of the fastest-growing private companies in America.

In 2022, ScienceSoft USA Corporation won the Health Tech Digital Award for Best Healthcare Technology Solution.

The Financial Times listed ScienceSoft USA Corporation among the 500 Americas’ fastest-growing companies from 2022 to 2026; ranking it at position 229 in 2026, 200 in 2025, 196 in 2024, 374 in 2023, and 433 in 2022.

From 2020 to 2026, ScienceSoft USA Corporation was featured in the IAOP Global Outsourcing 100 List.

In 2025, ScienceSoft was recognized as one of America's 300 Most Reliable Companies by Newsweek and Statista and included in the Newsweek Excellence Index.
