= SVFlux =

SVFLUX
- Developer(s): SoilVision Systems Ltd.
- Operating system: Microsoft Windows
- Available in: English
- Type: seepage/groundwater software
- License: Proprietary

SVFLUX is a finite element seepage analysis program developed by SoilVision Systems Ltd.. The software is designed to analyze both saturated and unsaturated flow through the ground through the solving of Richard's equation. The program is used in the fields of civil engineering and hydrology in order to analyze seepage and groundwater regional flow. The software is used for the calculation of flow rates, pore-water pressures, and pumping rates associated with regional groundwater flow. The software can be coupled with CHEMFLUX in order to calculate diffusion, advection, and decay rates or with SVHEAT in order to calculate thermal gradients and freeze/thaw fronts.

== Methodology ==
SVFLUX makes use of a general finite element solver to solve the Richards equation for both saturated and unsaturated flow. The finite element solver makes use of automatic mesh generation and automatic mesh refinement in order to aid in problem solution. The software has been used on large projects including the Questa Weathering Study which examined the flow regime through waste rock piles. Several forms of the flow governing equation are implemented in the software which provides greater flexibility in solving unique flow situations.

The user enters geometry, material properties, and analysis constraints through a CAD-type graphical user interface (GUI). The results may also be viewed in the context of a graphical user interface. The geometry is simply entered as regions which may be drawn, pasted in from Excel, or imported from AutoCAD DXF files. The factor of safety for a specific failure surface is computed as the forces driving failure along the surface divided by the shear resistance of the soils along the surface.

A library of benchmark models are distributed with the software.

== Features ==
The developers of SVFLUX have implemented all of the classic features traditionally found in seepage analysis software as well as an interesting list of new features.

The following is a list of some of the more distinct features of SVFLUX:

- Probabilistic analysis
- Unsaturated analysis with improved convergence
- Coupled climatic boundary conditions and calculation of actual evaporation (AE)
- Automatic mesh generation
- Automatic mesh refinement
- Support for parallel processing
- Large library of example models
- Simple and intuitive graphical user interface

Classic features also supported by the software include:

- Right-click application of boundary conditions and properties
- Help system and tutorial manual
- Solution for saturated and unsaturated flow
- Regional groundwater analysis
- Plotting of flowlines and streamtraces
- Reporting of fluxes
