= Clathrate gun hypothesis =

Meteorological hypothesis

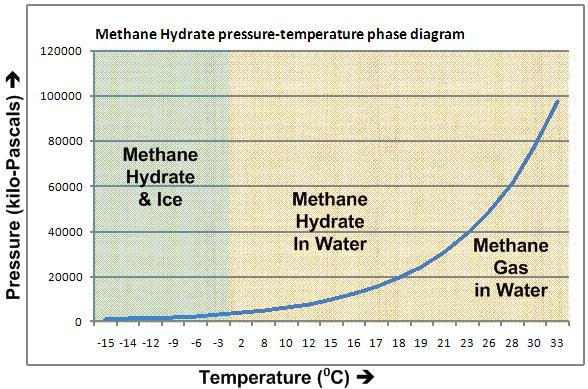
Methane clathrate is released as gas into the surrounding water column or soils when ambient temperature increases.

The clathrate gun hypothesis is a proposed explanation for the periods of rapid warming during the Quaternary. The hypothesis is that changes in fluxes in upper intermediate waters in the ocean caused temperature fluctuations that alternately accumulated and occasionally released methane clathrate on upper continental slopes. This would have had an immediate impact on the global temperature, as methane is a much more powerful greenhouse gas than carbon dioxide. Despite its atmospheric lifetime of around 12 years, methane's global warming potential is 72 times greater than that of carbon dioxide over 20 years, and 25 times over 100 years (33 when accounting for aerosol interactions). It is further proposed that these warming events caused the Bond cycles and individual interstadial events, such as the Dansgaard–Oeschger interstadials.

The hypothesis was supported for the Bølling–Allerød warming and Preboreal periods, but not for Dansgaard–Oeschger interstadials, although there are still debates on the topic. While it may be important on the millennial timescales, it is no longer considered relevant for the near future climate change: the IPCC Sixth Assessment Report states "It is very unlikely that gas clathrates (mostly methane) in deeper terrestrial permafrost and subsea clathrates will lead to a detectable departure from the emissions trajectory during this century".

== Mechanism ==
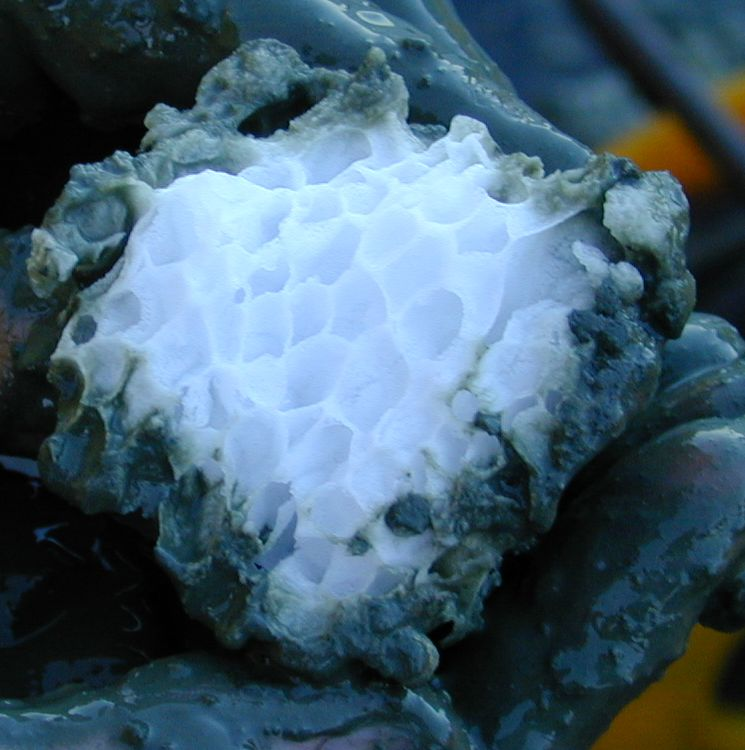
Specific structure of a gas hydrate piece, from the subduction zone off Oregon

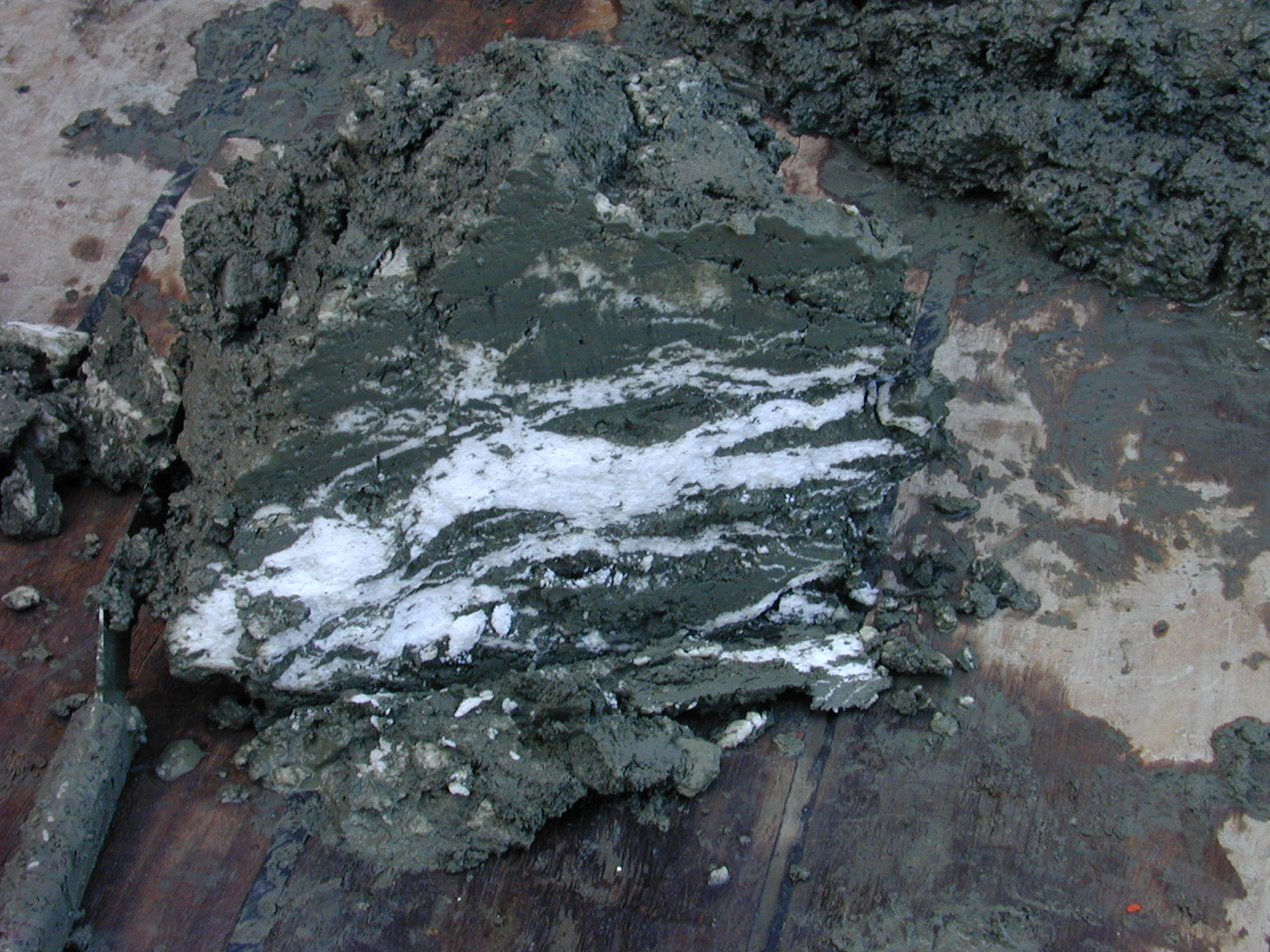
Gas hydrate-bearing sediment, from the subduction zone off Oregon

Methane clathrate, also known commonly as methane hydrate, is a form of water ice that contains a large amount of methane within its crystal structure. Potentially large deposits of methane clathrate have been found under sediments on the ocean floors of the Earth, although the estimates of total resource size given by various experts differ by many orders of magnitude, leaving doubt as to the size of methane clathrate deposits (particularly in the viability of extracting them as a fuel resource). Indeed, cores of greater than 10 centimeters' contiguous depth had only been found in three sites as of 2000, and some resource reserve size estimates for specific deposits/locations have been based primarily on seismology. The sudden release of large amounts of natural gas from methane clathrate deposits in runaway climate change could be a cause of past, future, and present climate changes.

In the Arctic Ocean, clathrates can exist in shallower water stabilized by lower temperatures rather than higher pressures; these may potentially be marginally stable much closer to the surface of the sea-bed, stabilized by a frozen 'lid' of permafrost preventing methane escape. The so-called self-preservation phenomenon has been studied by Russian geologists starting in the late 1980s. This metastable clathrate state can be a basis for release events of methane excursions, such as during the interval of the Last Glacial Maximum. A study from 2010 concluded with the possibility for a trigger of abrupt climate warming based on metastable methane clathrates in the East Siberian Arctic Shelf (ESAS) region.

== Possible past releases ==
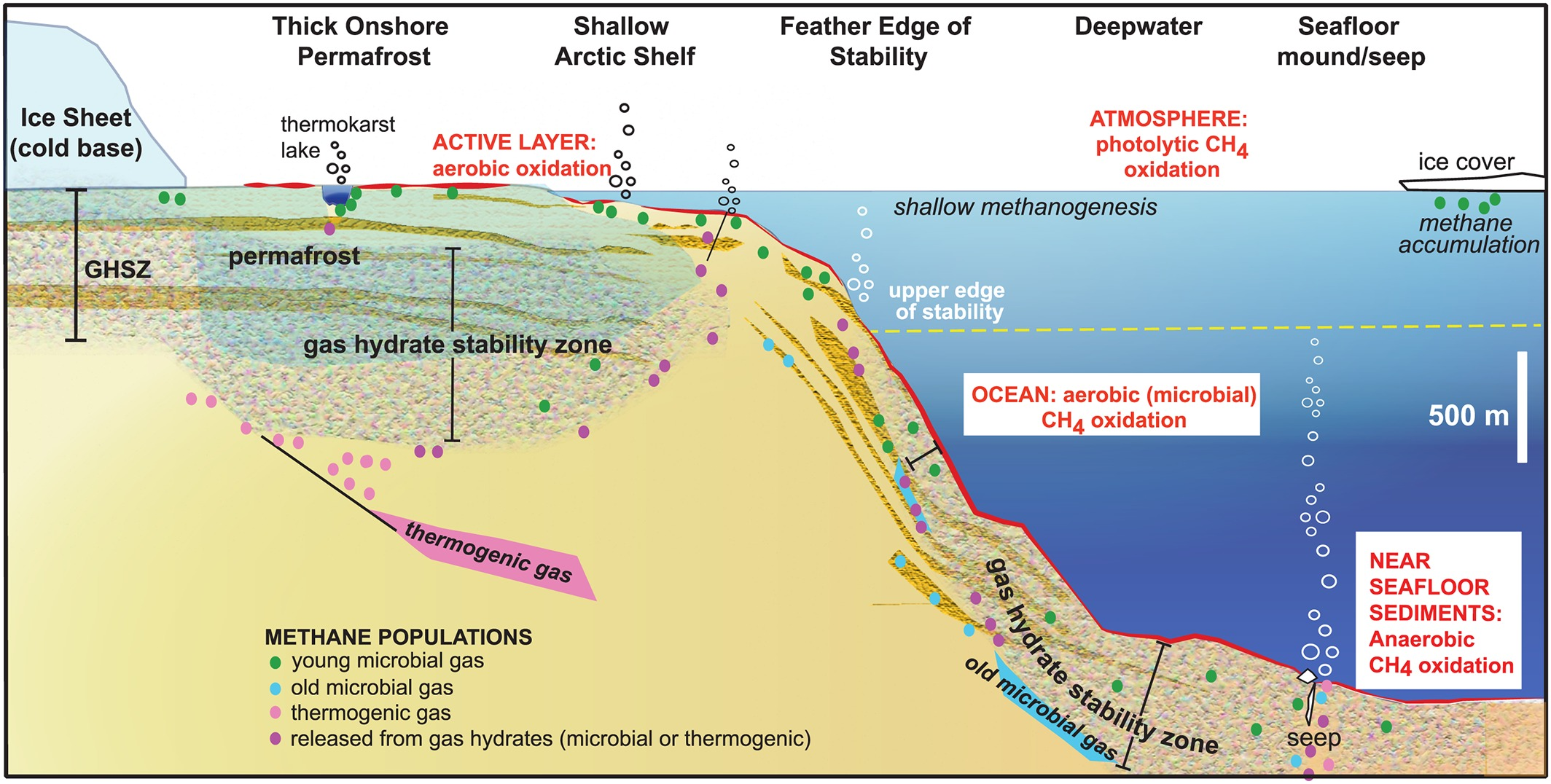
Gas-hydrate deposits by sector

Studies published in 2000 considered this hypothetical effect to be responsible for warming events in and at the end of the Last Glacial Maximum. Although periods of increased atmospheric methane match periods of continental-slope failure, later work found that the distinct deuterium/hydrogen (D/H) isotope ratio indicated that wetland methane emissions was the main contributor to atmospheric methane concentrations. While there were major dissociation events during the last deglaciation, with Bølling–Allerød warming triggering the disappearance of the entire methane hydrate deposit in the Barents Sea within 5000 years, those events failed to counteract the onset of a major Younger Dryas cooling period, suggesting that most of the methane stayed within the seawater after being liberated from the seafloor deposits, with very little entering the atmosphere.

In 2008, it was suggested that equatorial permafrost methane clathrate may have had a role in the sudden warm-up of "Snowball Earth", 630 million years ago.

Other events potentially linked to methane hydrate excursions are the Permian–Triassic extinction event and the Paleocene–Eocene Thermal Maximum.

=== Paleocene–Eocene Thermal Maximum ===
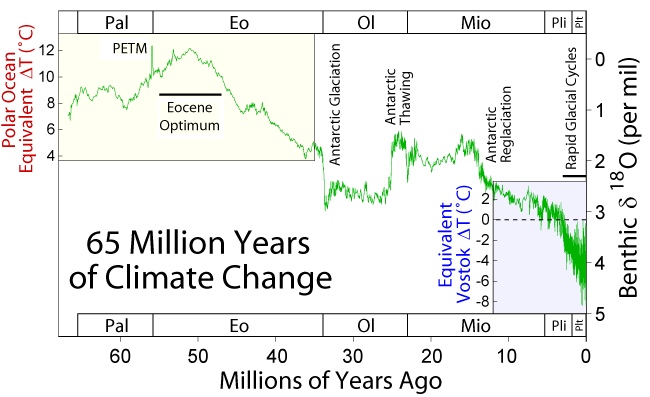
Climate change during the last 65 million years as expressed by the oxygen isotope composition of benthic foraminifera. The Paleocene-Eocene thermal maximum (PETM) is characterized by a brief but prominent excursion, attributed to rapid warming. Note that the excursion is understated in this graph due to the smoothing of data.

The Paleocene–Eocene thermal maximum (PETM), alternatively Eocene thermal maximum 1 (ETM1) and formerly known as the Initial Eocene or Late Paleocene thermal maximum, was a geologically brief time interval characterized by a 5–8 °C (9–14 °F) global average temperature rise and massive input of carbon into the ocean and atmosphere. The event began, now formally codified, at the precise time boundary between the Paleocene and Eocene geological epochs. The PETM lasted about 200,000 years, and occurred about 56 million years ago.

The PETM arguably represents the best past analogue by which to understand how global warming and the carbon cycle operate in a greenhouse world. The time interval is marked by a prominent negative excursion in carbon stable isotope (δ^{13}C) records from around the globe; more specifically, a large decrease in the ^{13}C/^{12}C ratio of marine and terrestrial carbonates and organic carbon has been found and correlated across hundreds of locations. The magnitude and timing of the PETM (δ^{13}C) excursion, which attest to the massive past carbon release to the ocean and atmosphere, and the source of this carbon remain topics of considerable current geoscience research.

What has become clear over the last few decades is that stratigraphic sections across the PETM reveal numerous changes beyond warming and carbon emission. Consistent with an Epoch boundary, fossil records of many organisms show major turnovers. In the marine realm, a mass extinction of benthic foraminifera, a global expansion of subtropical dinoflagellates, and an appearance of excursion taxa, including within planktic foraminifera and calcareous nannofossils, all occurred during the beginning stages of the PETM. On land, many modern mammal orders (including primates) suddenly appear in Europe and in North America.

In order for the clathrate hypothesis to be applicable to PETM, the oceans must show signs of having been warmer slightly before the carbon isotope excursion, because it would take some time for the methane to become mixed into the system and δ^{13}C-reduced carbon to be returned to the deep ocean sedimentary record. Up until the 2000s, the evidence suggested that the two peaks were in fact simultaneous, weakening the support for the methane theory. In 2002, a short gap between the initial warming and the δ^{13}C excursion was detected. In 2007, chemical markers of surface temperature (TEX_{86}) had also indicated that warming occurred around 3,000 years before the carbon isotope excursion, although this did not seem to hold true for all cores. However, research in 2005 found no evidence of this time gap in the deeper (non-surface) waters. Moreover, the small apparent change in TEX_{86} that precede the δ^{13}C anomaly can easily (and more plausibly) be ascribed to local variability (especially on the Atlantic coastal plain, e.g. Sluijs, et al., 2007) as the TEX_{86} paleo-thermometer is prone to significant biological effects.

The δ^{18}O of benthic or planktonic forams does not show any pre-warming in any of these localities, and in an ice-free world, it is generally a much more reliable indicator of past ocean temperatures. Analysis of these records reveals another interesting fact: planktonic (floating) forams record the shift to lighter isotope values earlier than benthic (bottom dwelling) forams. The lighter (lower δ^{13}C) methanogenic carbon can only be incorporated into foraminifer shells after it has been oxidised. A gradual release of the gas would allow it to be oxidised in the deep ocean, which would make benthic foraminifera show lighter values earlier. The fact that the planktonic foraminifera are the first to show the signal suggests that the methane was released so rapidly that its oxidation used up all the oxygen at depth in the water column, allowing some methane to reach the atmosphere unoxidised, where atmospheric oxygen would react with it. This observation also allows us to constrain the duration of methane release to under around 10,000 years.

However, there are several major problems with the methane hydrate dissociation hypothesis. The most parsimonious interpretation for surface-water foraminifera to show the δ^{13}C excursion before their benthic counterparts (as in the Thomas et al. paper) is that the perturbation occurred from the top down, and not the bottom up. If the anomalous δ^{13}C (in whatever form: CH_{4} or CO_{2}) entered the atmospheric carbon reservoir first, and then diffused into the surface ocean waters, which mix with the deeper ocean waters over much longer time-scales, we would expect to observe the planktonics shifting toward lighter values before the benthics.

An additional critique of the methane clathrate release hypothesis is that the warming effects of large-scale methane release would not be sustainable for more than a millennium. Thus, exponents of this line of criticism suggest that methane clathrate release could not have been the main driver of the PETM, which lasted for 50,000 to 200,000 years.

There has been some debate about whether there was a large enough amount of methane hydrate to be a major carbon source; a 2011 paper proposed that was the case. The present-day global methane hydrate reserve was once considered to be between 2,000 and 10,000 Gt C (billions of tons of carbon), but is now estimated between 1500 and 2000 Gt C. However, because the global ocean bottom temperatures were ~6 °C higher than today, which implies a much smaller volume of sediment hosting gas hydrate than today, the global amount of hydrate before the PETM has been thought to be much less than present-day estimates. One study, however, suggests that because seawater oxygen content was lower, sufficient methane clathrate deposits could have been present to make them a viable mechanism for explaining the isotopic changes. In a 2006 study, scientists regarded the source of carbon for the PETM to be a mystery. A 2011 study, using numerical simulations suggests that enhanced organic carbon sedimentation and methanogenesis could have compensated for the smaller volume of hydrate stability. A 2016 study based on reconstructions of atmospheric CO_{2} content during the PETM's carbon isotope excursions (CIE), using triple oxygen isotope analysis, suggests a massive release of seabed methane into the atmosphere as the driver of climatic changes. The authors also state that a massive release of methane hydrates through thermal dissociation of methane hydrate deposits has been the most convincing hypothesis for explaining the CIE ever since it was first identified, according to them.

In 2019, a study suggested that there was a global warming of around 2 degrees several millennia before PETM, and that this warming had eventually destabilized methane hydrates and caused the increased carbon emission during PETM, as evidenced by the large increase in barium ocean concentrations (since PETM-era hydrate deposits would have been also been rich in barium, and would have released it upon their meltdown). In 2022, a foraminiferal records study had reinforced this conclusion, suggesting that the release of CO_{2} before PETM was comparable to the current anthropogenic emissions in its rate and scope, to the point that there was enough time for a recovery to background levels of warming and ocean acidification in the centuries to millennia between the so-called pre-onset excursion (POE) and the main event (carbon isotope excursion, or CIE). A 2021 paper had further indicated that while PETM began with a significant intensification of volcanic activity and that lower-intensity volcanic activity sustained elevated carbon dioxide levels, "at least one other carbon reservoir released significant greenhouse gases in response to initial warming".

=== Permian–Triassic extinction event ===

Plot of extinction intensity (percentage of marine genera that are present in each interval of time but do not exist in the following interval) vs time in the past. Geological periods are annotated (by abbreviation and colour) above. The Permian–Triassic extinction event is the most significant event for marine genera, with just over 50% (according to this source) perishing. (source and image info)

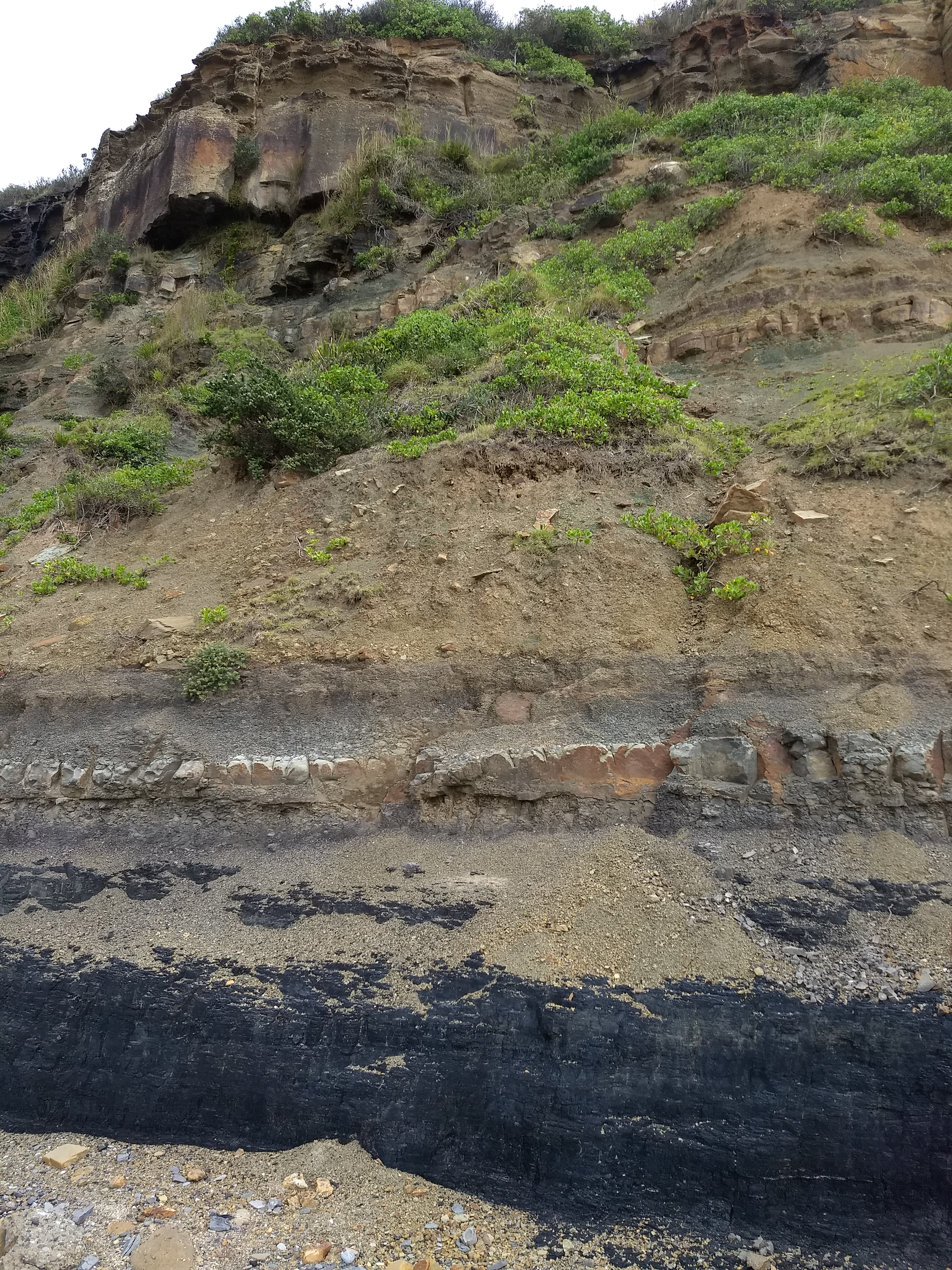
Permian–Triassic boundary at Frazer Beach in New South Wales, with the End Permian extinction event located just above the coal layer

The Permian–Triassic extinction event (Note: also known as the P–T extinction event, the Permian Extinction, the Permian–Triassic Mass Extinction (PTME), the Late Permian extinction event, the Latest Permian extinction event, the End-Permian extinction event, or the Great Dying.) was an extinction event that occurred around the boundary between the Permian and Triassic geologic periods, and with them the Paleozoic and Mesozoic eras. It is Earth's most severe known extinction event, with the extinction of 57% of biological families, 62% of genera, 81% of marine species, and 70% of terrestrial vertebrate species. It is also the greatest known mass extinction of insects. It is the greatest of the "Big Five" mass extinctions of the Phanerozoic. There is evidence for one to three distinct pulses, or phases, of extinction, with the major pulse of marine extinction occurring in a 60,000-100,000 year interval around 251.902 million years ago (mya) marking the boundary between the Permian and Triassic periods. There is some controversy regarding the chronology of the extinctions on land and whether they are synchronous with the main marine extinction event.

The scientific consensus is that the main cause of the extinction was the flood basalt eruptions that created the Siberian Traps, which released sulfur dioxide and carbon dioxide, resulting in euxinia (oxygen-starved, sulfurous oceans), elevated global temperatures, and acidified oceans. The level of atmospheric carbon dioxide rose from around 400 ppm to 2,500 ppm with approximately 3,900 to 12,000 gigatonnes of carbon being added to the ocean-atmosphere system during this period.

Several other contributing factors have been proposed, including the emission of carbon dioxide from the burning of oil and coal deposits ignited by the eruptions; emissions of methane from the gasification of methane clathrates; emissions of methane by novel methanogenic microorganisms nourished by minerals dispersed in the eruptions; longer and more intense El Niño events; and an extraterrestrial impact that created the Araguainha crater and caused seismic release of methane and the destruction of the ozone layer with increased exposure to solar radiation.

Massive release of methane from these clathrates may have contributed to the PTME, as scientists have found worldwide evidence of a swift decrease of about 1% in the ^{13}C / ^{12}C ratio in carbonate rocks from the end-Permian. This is the first, largest, and fastest of a series of excursions (decreases and increases) in the ratio, until it abruptly stabilised in the middle Triassic, followed soon afterwards by the recovery of calcifying shelled sealife. The seabed probably contained methane hydrate deposits, and the lava caused the deposits to dissociate, releasing vast quantities of methane. A large release of methane could cause significant global warming, since methane is a very potent greenhouse gas. Strong evidence suggests the global temperatures increased by about 6 °C (10.8 °F) near the equator and therefore by more at higher latitudes: a sharp decrease in oxygen isotope ratios (^{18}O / ^{16}O); the extinction of Glossopteris flora (Glossopteris and plants that grew in the same areas), which needed a cold climate, with its replacement by floras typical of lower paleolatitudes. It was also suggested that a large-scale release of methane and other greenhouse gases from the ocean into the atmosphere was connected to the anoxic events and euxinic (sulfidic) events at the time, with the exact mechanism compared to the 1986 Lake Nyos disaster.

The clathrate hypothesis seemed the only proposed mechanism sufficient to cause a global 1% reduction in the ^{13}C / ^{12}C ratio . While a variety of factors may have contributed to the ratio drop, a 2002 review found most of them insufficient to account for the observed amount:

- Gases from volcanic eruptions have a ^{13}C / ^{12}C ratio about 0.5 to 0.8% below standard (δ^{13}C −0.5 to −0.8%), but a 1995 assessment concluded that the observed 1.0% worldwide reduction would have required eruptions massively larger than any found. (However, this analysis addressed only CO_{2} produced by the magma itself, not from interactions with carbon bearing sediments, as described below.)
- A reduction in organic activity would extract ^{12}C more slowly from the environment and leave more of it to be incorporated into sediments, thus reducing the ^{13}C / ^{12}C ratio. Biochemical processes preferentially use the lighter isotopes since chemical reactions are ultimately driven by electromagnetic forces between atoms and lighter isotopes respond more quickly to these forces, but a study of a smaller drop of 0.3 to 0.4% in ^{13}C / ^{12}C (δ^{13}C −3 to −4 ‰) at the Paleocene-Eocene Thermal Maximum (PETM) concluded that even transferring all the organic carbon (in organisms, soils, and dissolved in the ocean) into sediments would be insufficient: Even such a large burial of material rich in ^{12}C would not have produced the 'smaller' drop in the ^{13}C / ^{12}C ratio of the rocks around the PETM.
- Buried sedimentary organic matter has a ^{13}C / ^{12}C ratio 2.0 to 2.5% below normal (δ^{13}C −2.0 to −2.5%). Theoretically, if the sea level fell sharply, shallow marine sediments would be exposed to oxidation. But 6,500–8,400 gigatonnes (1 gigatonne = 10^{12} kg) of organic carbon would have to be oxidized and returned to the ocean-atmosphere system within less than a few hundred thousand years to reduce the ^{13}C / ^{12}C ratio by 1.0%, which is not thought to be a realistic possibility. Moreover, sea levels were rising rather than falling at the time of the extinction.
- Rather than a sudden decline in sea level, intermittent periods of ocean-bottom hyperoxia and anoxia (high-oxygen and low- or zero-oxygen conditions) may have caused the ^{13}C / ^{12}C ratio fluctuations in the Early Triassic; and global anoxia may have been responsible for the end-Permian blip. The continents of the end-Permian and early Triassic were more clustered in the tropics than they are now, and large tropical rivers would have dumped sediment into smaller, partially enclosed ocean basins at low latitudes. Such conditions favor oxic and anoxic episodes; oxic/anoxic conditions would result in a rapid release/burial, respectively, of large amounts of organic carbon, which has a low ^{13}C / ^{12}C ratio because biochemical processes use the lighter isotopes more. That or another organic-based reason may have been responsible for both that and a late Proterozoic/Cambrian pattern of fluctuating ^{13}C / ^{12}C ratios.

However, the clathrate hypothesis has also been criticized. Carbon-cycle models that account for the roasting of carbonate sediments by volcanism confirm that this process would have had a sufficient effect to produce the observed reduction. Also, the pattern of isotope shifts expected to result from a massive release of methane does not match the patterns seen throughout the Early Triassic. Not only would such a cause require the release of five times as much methane as postulated for the PETM, but would it also have to be reburied at an unrealistically high rate to account for the rapid increases in the ^{13}C / ^{12}C ratio (episodes of high positive δ^{13}C) throughout the early Triassic before it was released several times again. The latest research suggests that greenhouse gas release during the extinction event was dominated by volcanic carbon dioxide, and while methane release had to have contributed, isotopic signatures show that thermogenic methane released from the Siberian Traps had consistently played a larger role than methane from clathrates and any other biogenic sources such as wetlands during the event.

Adding to the evidence against methane clathrate release as the central driver of warming, the main rapid warming event is also associated with marine transgression rather than regression; the former would not normally have initiated methane release, which would have instead required a decrease in pressure, something that a retreat of shallow seas would generate. The configuration of the world's landmasses into one supercontinent would also mean that the global gas hydrate reservoir was lower than today, further damaging the case for methane clathrate dissolution as a major cause of the carbon cycle disruption.

== Climate change feedback ==
=== Modern deposits ===
Most deposits of methane clathrate are in sediments too deep to respond rapidly, and 2007 modelling by Archer suggests that the methane forcing derived from them should remain a minor component of the overall greenhouse effect. Clathrate deposits destabilize from the deepest part of their stability zone, which is typically hundreds of metres below the seabed. A sustained increase in sea temperature will warm its way through the sediment eventually, and cause the shallowest, most marginal clathrate to start to break down; but it will typically take on the order of a thousand years or more for the temperature change to get that far into the seabed. Further, subsequent research on midlatitude deposits in the Atlantic and Pacific Ocean found that any methane released from the seafloor, no matter the source, fails to reach the atmosphere once the depth exceeds 430 m (1,411 ft), while geological characteristics of the area make it impossible for hydrates to exist at depths shallower than 550 m (1,804 ft).

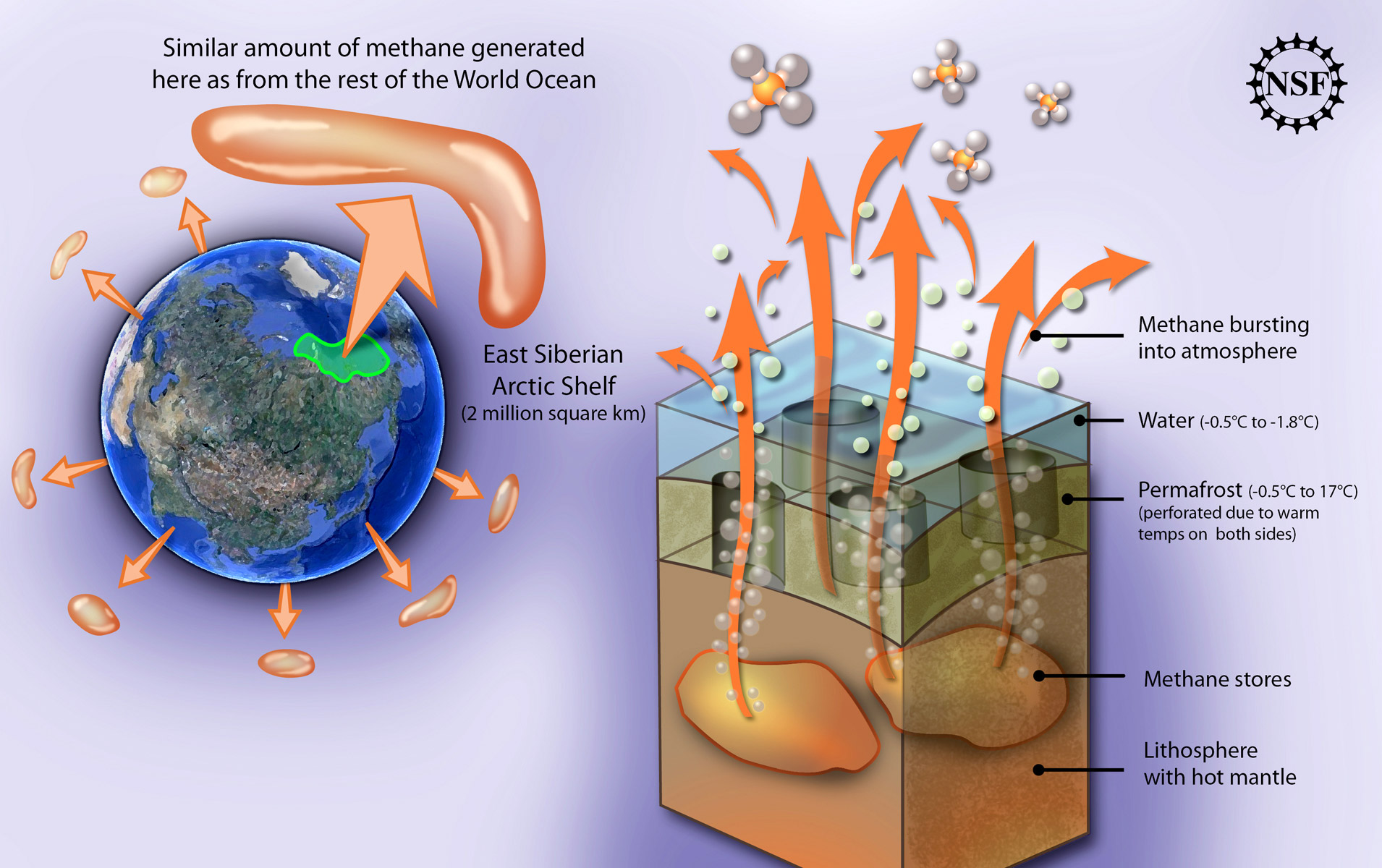
Potential Methane release in the Eastern Siberian Arctic Shelf

However, some methane clathrates deposits in the Arctic are much shallower than the rest, which could make them far more vulnerable to warming. A trapped gas deposit on the continental slope off Canada in the Beaufort Sea, located in an area of small conical hills on the ocean floor is just 290 m (951 ft) below sea level and considered the shallowest known deposit of methane hydrate. However, the East Siberian Arctic Shelf averages 45 meters in depth, and it is assumed that below the seafloor, sealed by sub-sea permafrost layers, hydrates deposits are located. This would mean that when the warming potentially talik or pingo-like features within the shelf, they would also serve as gas migration pathways for the formerly frozen methane, and a lot of attention has been paid to that possibility. Shakhova et al. (2008) estimate that not less than 1,400 gigatonnes of carbon is presently locked up as methane and methane hydrates under the Arctic submarine permafrost, and 5–10% of that area is subject to puncturing by open talik. Their paper initially included the line that the "release of up to 50 gigatonnes of predicted amount of hydrate storage [is] highly possible for abrupt release at any time". A release on this scale would increase the methane content of the planet's atmosphere by a factor of twelve, equivalent in greenhouse effect to a doubling in the 2008 level of CO_{2}.

This is what led to the original clathrate gun hypothesis, and in 2008 the United States Department of Energy National Laboratory system and the United States Geological Survey's Climate Change Science Program both identified potential clathrate destabilization in the Arctic as one of four most serious scenarios for abrupt climate change, which have been singled out for priority research. The USCCSP released a report in late December 2008 estimating the gravity of this risk. A 2012 study of the effects for the original hypothesis, based on a coupled climate–carbon cycle model (GCM) assessed a 1000-fold (from <1 to 1000 ppmv) methane increase—within a single pulse, from methane hydrates (based on carbon amount estimates for the PETM, with ~2000 GtC), and concluded it would increase atmospheric temperatures by more than 6 °C within 80 years. Further, carbon stored in the land biosphere would decrease by less than 25%, suggesting a critical situation for ecosystems and farming, especially in the tropics. Another 2012 assessment of the literature identifies methane hydrates on the Shelf of East Arctic Seas as a potential trigger.

A risk of seismic activity being potentially responsible for mass methane releases has been considered as well. In 2012, seismic observations destabilizing methane hydrate along the continental slope of the eastern United States, following the intrusion of warmer ocean currents, suggests that underwater landslides could release methane. The estimated amount of methane hydrate in this slope is 2.5 gigatonnes (about 0.2% of the amount required to cause the PETM), and it is unclear if the methane could reach the atmosphere. However, the authors of the study caution: "It is unlikely that the western North Atlantic margin is the only area experiencing changing ocean currents; our estimate of 2.5 gigatonnes of destabilizing methane hydrate may therefore represent only a fraction of the methane hydrate currently destabilizing globally." Bill McGuire notes, "There may be a threat of submarine landslides around the margins of Greenland, which are less well explored. Greenland is already uplifting, reducing the pressure on the crust beneath and also on submarine methane hydrates in the sediment around its margins, and increased seismic activity may be apparent within decades as active faults beneath the ice sheet are unloaded. This could provide the potential for the earthquake or methane hydrate destabilisation of submarine sediment, leading to the formation of submarine slides and, perhaps, tsunamis in the North Atlantic."

=== Observed emissions ===
==== East Siberian Arctic Shelf ====
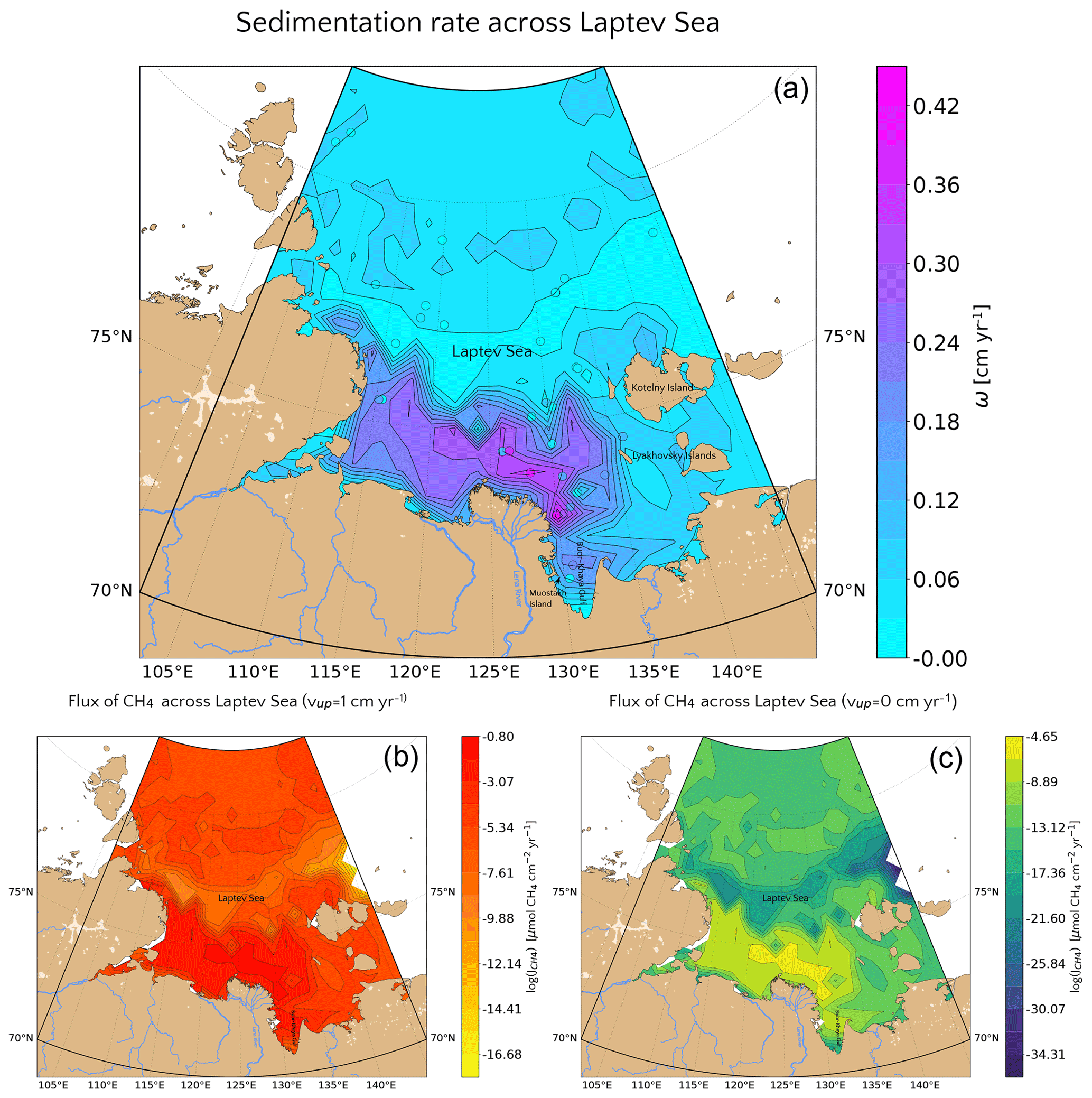
Methane releases in Laptev Sea are typically consumed within the sediment by methanotrophs. Areas with high sedimentation (top) subject their microbial communities to continual disturbance, and so they are the most likely to see active fluxes, whether with (right) or without active upward flow (left). Even so, the annual release may be limited to 1000 tonnes or less.

Research carried out in 2008 in the Siberian Arctic showed methane releases on the annual scale of millions of tonnes, which was a substantial increase on the previous estimate of 0.5 millions of tonnes per year. apparently through perforations in the seabed permafrost, with concentrations in some regions reaching up to 100 times normal levels. The excess methane has been detected in localized hotspots in the outfall of the Lena River and the border between the Laptev Sea and the East Siberian Sea. At the time, some of the melting was thought to be the result of geological heating, but more thawing was believed to be due to the greatly increased volumes of meltwater being discharged from the Siberian rivers flowing north.

By 2013, the same team of researchers used multiple sonar observations to quantify the density of bubbles emanating from subsea permafrost into the ocean (a process called ebullition), and found that 100–630 mg methane per square meter is emitted daily along the East Siberian Arctic Shelf (ESAS), into the water column. They also found that during storms, when wind accelerates air-sea gas exchange, methane levels in the water column drop dramatically. Observations suggest that methane release from seabed permafrost will progress slowly, rather than abruptly. However, Arctic cyclones, fueled by global warming, and further accumulation of greenhouse gases in the atmosphere could contribute to more rapid methane release from this source. Altogether, their updated estimate had now amounted to 17 millions of tonnes per year.

However, these findings were soon questioned, as this rate of annual release would mean that the ESAS alone would account for between 28% and 75% of the observed Arctic methane emissions, which contradicts many other studies. In January 2020, it was found that the rate at which methane enters the atmosphere after it had been released from the shelf deposits into the water column had been greatly overestimated, and observations of atmospheric methane fluxes taken from multiple ship cruises in the Arctic instead indicate that only around 3.02 million tonnes of methane are emitted annually from the ESAS. A modelling study published in 2020 suggested that under the present-day conditions, annual methane release from the ESAS may be as low as 1000 tonnes, with 2.6 – 4.5 million tonnes representing the peak potential of turbulent emissions from the shelf.

==== Beaufort Sea continental slope ====
Profile illustrating the continental shelf, slope and rise

A radiocarbon dating study in 2018 found that after the 30-meter isobath, only around 10% of the methane in surface waters can be attributed to ancient permafrost or methane hydrates. The authors suggested that even a significantly accelerated methane release would still largely fail to reach the atmosphere.

==== Svalbard ====
Hong et al. (2017) studied methane seepage in the shallow arctic seas at the Barents Sea close to Svalbard. Temperature at the seabed has fluctuated seasonally over the last century, between −1.8 °C (28.8 °F) and 4.8 °C (40.6 °F), it has only affected release of methane to a depth of about 1.6 meters at the sediment–water interface. Hydrates can be stable through the top 60 meters of the sediments and the current observed releases originate from deeper below the sea floor. They conclude that the increased methane flux started hundreds to thousands of years ago, noted about it, "..episodic ventilation of deep reservoirs rather than warming-induced gas hydrate dissociation." Summarizing his research, Hong stated:

The results of our study indicate that the immense seeping found in this area is a result of natural state of the system. Understanding how methane interacts with other important geological, chemical and biological processes in the Earth system is essential and should be the emphasis of our scientific community.

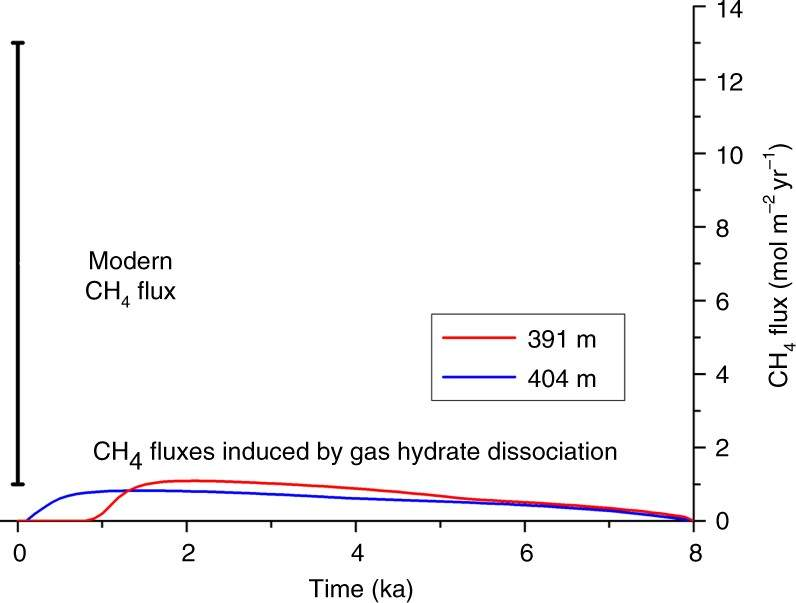
Methane releases specifically attributed to hydrate dissociation in the Svalbard appear to be much lower than the leaks from other methane sources.

Research by Wallmann et al. (2018) concluded that hydrate dissociation at Svalbard 8,000 years ago was due to isostatic rebound (continental uplift following deglaciation). As a result, the water depth got shallower with less hydrostatic pressure, without further warming. The study, also found that today's deposits at the site become unstable at a depth of ~ 400 meters, due to seasonal bottom water warming, and it remains unclear if this is due to natural variability or anthropogenic warming. Moreover, another paper published in 2017 found that only 0.07% of the methane released from the gas hydrate dissociation at Svalbard appears to reach the atmosphere, and usually only when the wind speeds were low. In 2020, a subsequent study confirmed that only a small fraction of methane from the Svalbard seeps reaches the atmosphere, and that the wind speed holds a greater influence on the rate of release than dissolved methane concentration on site.

Finally, a paper published in 2017 indicated that the methane emissions from at least one seep field at Svalbard were more than compensated for by the enhanced carbon dioxide uptake due to the greatly increased phytoplankton activity in this nutrient-rich water. The daily amount of carbon dioxide absorbed by the phytoplankton was 1,900 greater than the amount of methane emitted, and the negative (i.e. indirectly cooling) radiative forcing from the CO_{2} uptake was up to 251 times greater than the warming from the methane release.

=== Current outlook ===
In 2014 based on their research on the northern United States Atlantic marine continental margins from Cape Hatteras to Georges Bank, a group of scientists from the US Geological Survey, the Department of Geosciences, Mississippi State University, Department of Geological Sciences, Brown University and Earth Resources Technology, found widespread leakage of methane from the seafloor, but they did not assign specific dates, beyond suggesting that some of the seeps were more than 1000 years old. In March 2017, a meta-analysis by the USGS Gas Hydrates Project concluded:

Our review is the culmination of nearly a decade of original research by the USGS, my coauthor Professor John Kessler at the University of Rochester, and many other groups in the community," said USGS geophysicist Carolyn Ruppel, who is the paper's lead author and oversees the USGS Gas Hydrates Project. "After so many years spent determining where gas hydrates are breaking down and measuring methane flux at the sea-air interface, we suggest that conclusive evidence for release of hydrate-related methane to the atmosphere is lacking.

In June 2017, scientists from the Center for Arctic Gas Hydrate (CAGE), Environment and Climate at the University of Tromsø, published a study describing over a hundred ocean sediment craters, some 300 meters wide and up to 30 meters deep, formed due to explosive eruptions, attributed to destabilizing methane hydrates, following ice-sheet retreat during the last glacial period, around 15,000 years ago, a few centuries after the Bølling–Allerød warming. These areas around the Barents Sea, still seep methane today, and still existing bulges with methane reservoirs could eventually have the same fate. Later that same year, the Arctic Council published SWIPA 2017 report, where it cautioned "Arctic sources and sinks of greenhouse gases are still hampered by data and knowledge gaps."

In 2018, a perspective piece devoted to tipping points in the climate system suggested that the climate change contribution from methane hydrates would be "negligible" by the end of the century, but could amount to 0.4–0.5 °C (0.72–0.90 °F) on the millennial timescales. In 2021, the IPCC Sixth Assessment Report no longer included methane hydrates in the list of potential tipping points, and says that "it is very unlikely that CH_{4} emissions from clathrates will substantially warm the climate system over the next few centuries." The report had also linked terrestrial hydrate deposits to gas emission craters discovered in the Yamal Peninsula in Siberia, Russia beginning in July 2014, but noted that since terrestrial gas hydrates predominantly form at a depth below 200 meters, a substantial response within the next few centuries can be ruled out. Likewise, a 2022 assessment of tipping points described methane hydrates as a "threshold-free feedback" rather than a tipping point.

== In fiction ==
- The science fiction novel Mother of Storms by John Barnes offers a fictional example of catastrophic climate change caused by methane clathrate release.
- In The Life Lottery by Ian Irvine unprecedented seismic activity triggers a release of methane hydrate, reversing global cooling.
- The hypothesis is the basis of an experiment in the PlayStation 2 game Death By Degrees.
- In Transcendent by Stephen Baxter, averting such a crisis is a major plotline.
- The novel The Black Silent by author David Dun features this idea as a key scientific point.
- In the anime Ergo Proxy, a string of explosions in the methane hydrate reserves wipes out 85% of species on Earth.
- The novel The Far Shore of Time by Frederik Pohl features an alien race attempting to destroy humanity by bombing the methane clathrate reserves, thus releasing the gas into the atmosphere.
- The novel The Swarm by Frank Schätzing features what first appear to be freak events related to the world's oceans.
- In Charles Stross' Laundry Files universe, an intentionally triggered clathrate gun scenario is viewed as a possible retaliatory strategy that could be utilized by Blue Hades in response to terminal violation of the Benthic Treaty.

== See also ==
- Atlantic meridional overturning circulation
- Azolla event
- Clathrate compound
- Effects of climate change
- Extinction event
- Limnic eruption
- Methane chimney
- Ocean acidification
- Storegga Slide
