= Methane clathrate =

Methane-water lattice compound

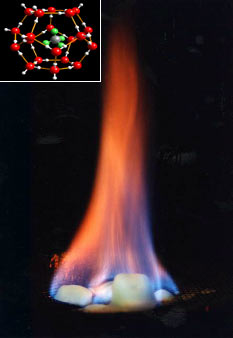
"Burning ice". Methane, released by heating, burns; water drips. Inset: clathrate structure (University of Göttingen, GZG. Abt. Kristallographie). Source: United States Geological Survey.

Methane clathrate (CH_{4}·5.75H_{2}O) or (4CH_{4}·23H_{2}O), also called methane hydrate, hydromethane, methane ice, fire ice, natural gas hydrate, or gas hydrate, is a solid clathrate compound (more specifically, a clathrate hydrate) in which a large amount of methane is trapped within a crystal structure of water, forming a solid similar to ice. Originally thought to occur only in the outer regions of the Solar System, where temperatures are low and water ice is common, significant deposits of methane clathrate have been found under sediments on the ocean floors of the Earth (around 1100 m below the sea surface). Methane hydrate is formed when hydrogen-bonded water and methane gas come into contact at high pressures and low temperatures in oceans.

Methane clathrates are common constituents of the shallow marine geosphere and they occur in deep sedimentary structures and form outcrops on the ocean floor. Methane hydrates are believed to form by the precipitation or crystallisation of methane migrating from deep along geological faults. Precipitation occurs when the methane comes in contact with water within the sea bed subject to temperature and pressure. In 2008, research on Antarctic Vostok Station and EPICA Dome C ice cores revealed that methane clathrates were also present in deep Antarctic ice cores and record a history of atmospheric methane concentrations, dating to 800,000 years ago. The ice-core methane clathrate record is a primary source of data for global warming research, along with oxygen and carbon dioxide.

Methane clathrates used to be considered as a potential source of abrupt climate change, following the clathrate gun hypothesis. In this scenario, heating causes catastrophic melting and breakdown of primarily undersea hydrates, leading to a massive release of methane and accelerating warming. A 2020 review of the climate tipping points research concludes that for methane hydrate release the "likelihood of occurrence remains unclear". The tipping point cascades (such as Arctic ice loss causing further warming and a release of methane from hydrates) have only been studied starting from 2018. The IPCC Sixth Assessment Report ignores the uncertainty, claiming that no "detectable" impact on the global temperatures will occur in this century through this mechanism.

== General ==
Methane hydrates were discovered in Russia in the 1960s, and studies for extracting gas from it emerged at the beginning of the 21st century.

== Structure and composition ==
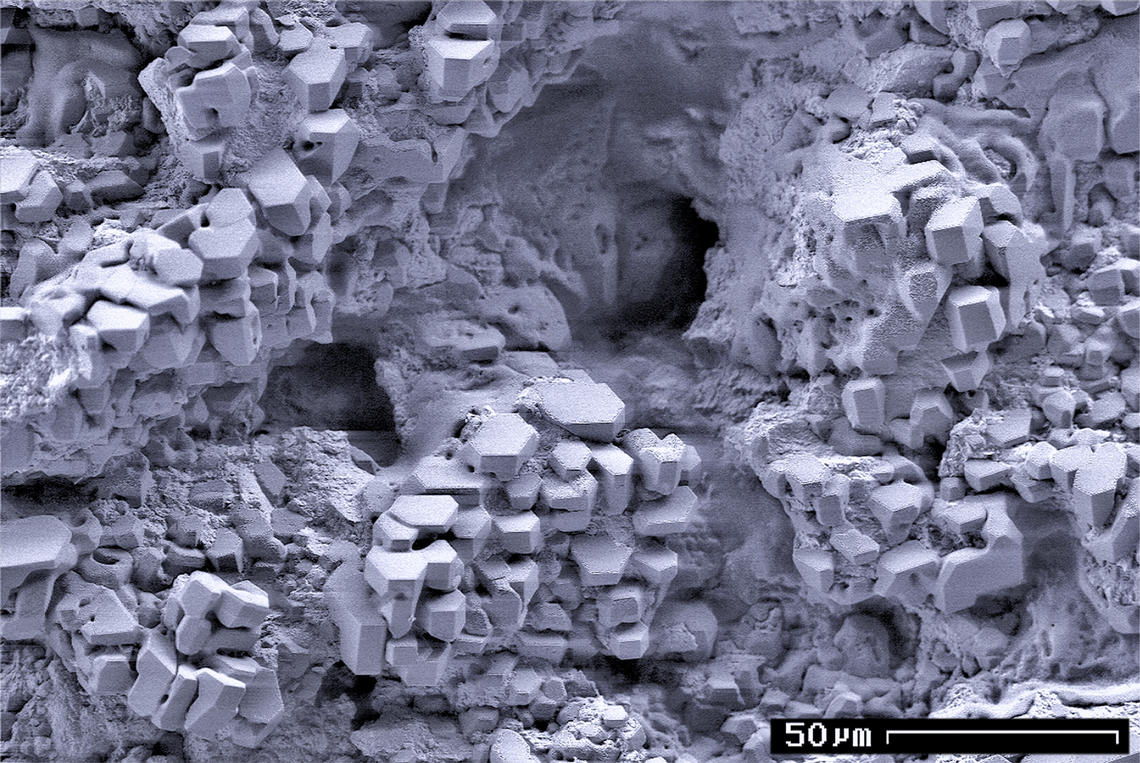
microscope image

The nominal methane clathrate hydrate composition is (CH_{4})_{4}(H_{2}O)_{23}, or 1 mole of methane for every 5.75 moles of water, corresponding to 13.4% methane by mass, although the actual composition is dependent on how many methane molecules fit into the various cage structures of the water lattice. The observed density is around 0.9 g/cm^{3}, which means that methane hydrate will float to the surface of the sea or of a lake unless it is bound in place by being formed in or anchored to sediment. One litre of fully saturated methane clathrate solid would therefore contain about 120 grams of methane (or around 169 litres of methane gas at 0 °C and 1 atm), (Note: The average methane clathrate hydrate composition is 1 mole of methane for every 5.75 moles of water. The observed density is around 0.9 g/cm^{3}. For one mole of methane, which has a molar mass of about 16.043 g (see Methane), we have 5.75 moles of water, with a molar mass of about 18.015 g (see Properties of water), so together for each mole of methane the clathrate complex has a mass of 16.043 g + 5.75 × 18.015 g ≈ 119.631 g. The fractional contribution of methane to the mass is then equal to 16.043 g / 119.631 g ≈ 0.1341. The density is around 0.9 g/cm^{3}, so one litre of methane clathrate has a mass of around 0.9 kg, and the mass of the methane contained therein is then about 0.1341 × 0.9 kg ≈ 0.1207 kg. At a density as a gas of 0.716 kg/m^{3} (at 0 °C; see the info box at Methane), this comes to a volume of 0.1207 / 0.716 m^{3} = 0.1686 m^{3} = 168.6 L.) or one cubic metre of methane clathrate releases about 160 cubic metres of gas.

Methane forms a "structure-I" hydrate with two dodecahedral (20 vertices, thus 20 water molecules) and six tetradecahedral (24 water molecules) water cages per unit cell. (Due to sharing of each water molecule between four cages, there are 46 water molecules and eight methane molecules per unit cell.) This compares with a hydration number of 20 for methane in aqueous solution. A methane clathrate MAS NMR spectrum recorded at 275 K and 3.1 MPa shows a peak for each cage type and a separate peak for gas phase methane. In 2003, a clay-methane hydrate intercalate was synthesized in which a methane hydrate complex was introduced at the interlayer of a sodium-rich montmorillonite clay. The upper temperature stability of this phase is similar to that of structure-I hydrate.

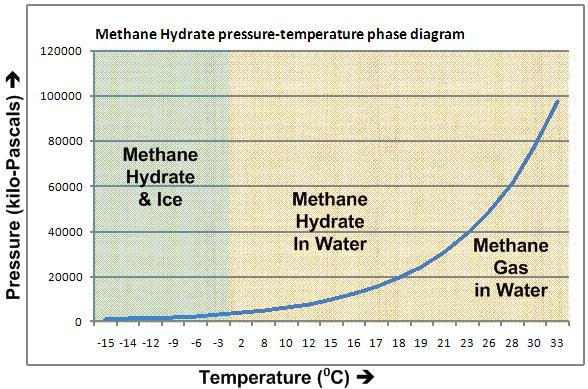
Methane hydrate phase diagram. The horizontal axis shows temperature from −15 to 33 °C, the vertical axis shows pressure from 0 to 120,000 kilopascals (0 to 1,184 atmospheres). Hydrate forms above the line. For example, at 4 °C hydrate forms above a pressure of about 50 atm/5000 kPa, found at about 500 m sea depth.

Under high pressure, methane hydrate can also form as a coexisting mixture of structure I and structure II, and neutron scattering experiments have shown that methane at the interface between the two structures diffuses several orders of magnitude faster than methane trapped within a single clathrate cage, a phenomenon attributed to confinement effects or transient nano-bubble formation at the structural interface.

Above roughly 2 gigapascals, methane clathrate transforms from the cage-based structure-I form into a denser "filled ice" phase (MH-III), in which methane molecules occupy channels within a water framework resembling ice Ih rather than discrete cages. Raman spectroscopy and ab initio molecular dynamics simulations have shown that a further high-pressure phase (MH-IV), with a water skeleton more closely isomorphic to ice Ih, forms near 40 GPa and remains stable to at least 150 GPa, the highest pressure at which any gas hydrate has been observed to persist — a regime relevant to the deep interiors of giant planets such as Uranus and Neptune.

== Natural deposits ==
Worldwide distribution of confirmed or inferred offshore gas hydrate-bearing sediments, 1996. Source: USGS

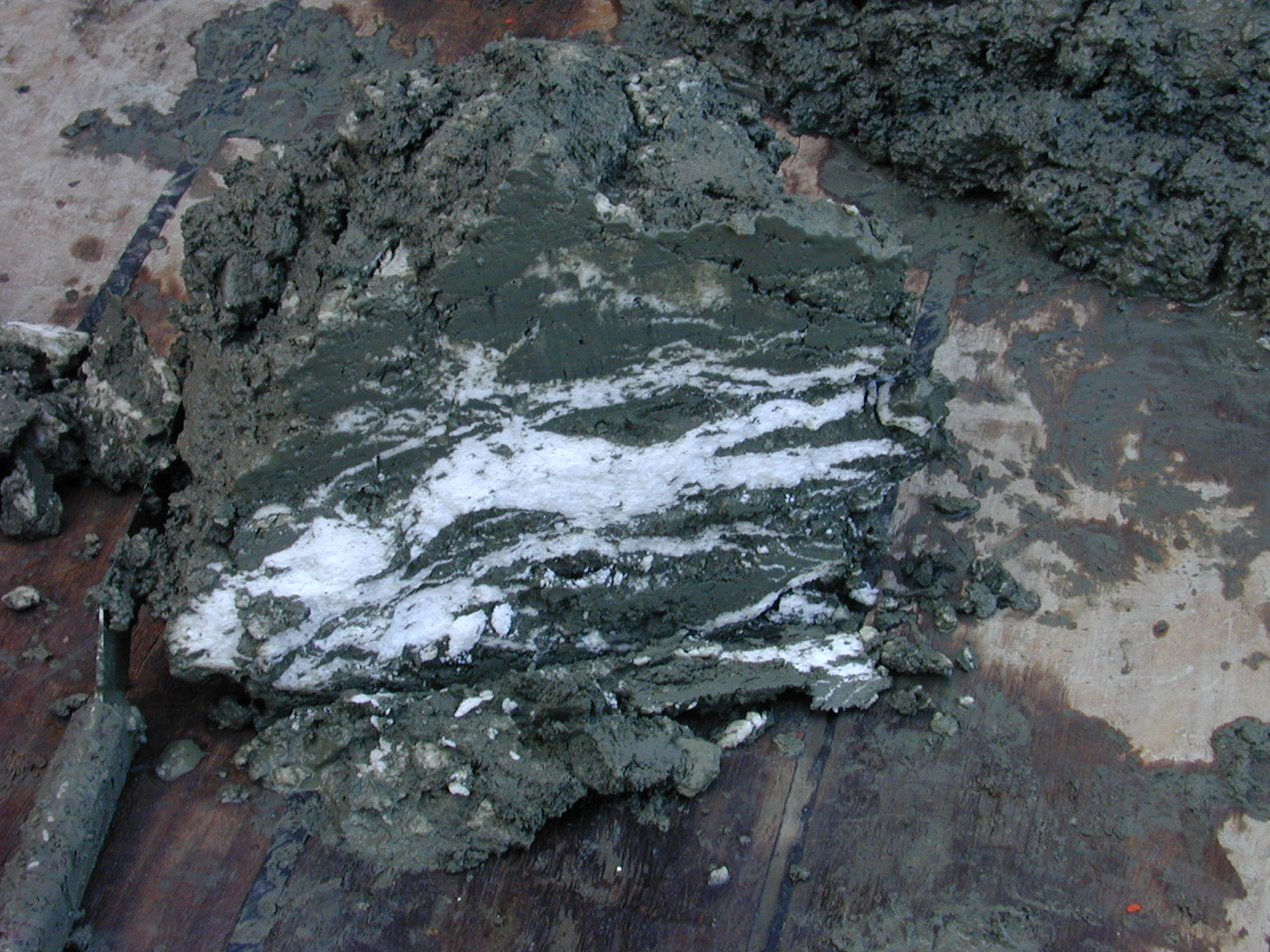
Gas hydrate-bearing sediment, from the subduction zone off Oregon

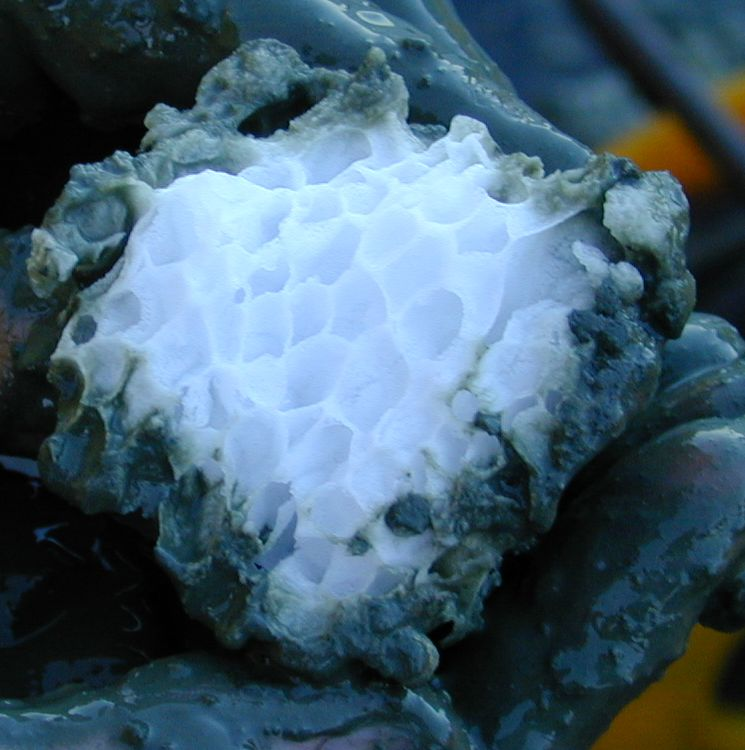
Specific structure of a gas hydrate piece, from the subduction zone off Oregon

Methane clathrates are restricted to the shallow lithosphere (i.e. < 2,000 m depth). Furthermore, necessary conditions are found only in either continental sedimentary rocks in polar regions where average surface temperatures are less than 0 °C; or in oceanic sediment at water depths greater than 300 m where the bottom water temperature is around 2 °C. In addition, deep fresh water lakes may host gas hydrates as well, e.g. the fresh water Lake Baikal, Siberia. Continental deposits have been located in Siberia and Alaska in sandstone and siltstone beds at less than 800 m depth. Oceanic deposits seem to be widespread in the continental shelf (see Fig.) and can occur within the sediments at depth or close to the sediment–water interface. They may cap even larger deposits of gaseous methane.

=== Oceanic ===
Methane hydrate can occur in various forms like massive, dispersed within pore spaces, nodules, veins/fractures/faults, and layered horizons. Generally, it is found unstable at standard pressure and temperature conditions, and 1 m^{3} of methane hydrate upon dissociation yields about 164 m^{3} of methane and 0.87 m^{3} of freshwater. There are two distinct types of oceanic deposits. The most common is dominated (> 99%) by methane contained in a structure I clathrate and generally found at depth in the sediment. Here, the methane is isotopically light (δ^{13}C < −60‰), which indicates that it is derived from the microbial reduction of CO_{2}. The clathrates in these deep deposits are thought to have formed in situ from the microbially produced methane since the δ^{13}C values of clathrate and surrounding dissolved methane are similar. However, it is also thought that freshwater used in the pressurization of oil and gas wells in permafrost and along the continental shelves worldwide combines with natural methane to form clathrate at depth and pressure since methane hydrates are more stable in freshwater than in saltwater. Local variations may be widespread since the act of forming hydrate, which extracts pure water from saline formation waters, can often lead to local and potentially significant increases in formation water salinity. Hydrates normally exclude the salt in the pore fluid from which it forms. Thus, they exhibit high electric resistivity like ice, and sediments containing hydrates have higher resistivity than sediments without gas hydrates (Judge [67]).

These deposits are located within a mid-depth zone around 300–500 m thick in the sediments (the gas hydrate stability zone, or GHSZ) where they coexist with methane dissolved in the fresh, not salt, pore-waters. Above this zone methane is only present in its dissolved form at concentrations that decrease towards the sediment surface. Below it, methane is gaseous. At Blake Ridge on the Atlantic continental rise, the GHSZ started at 190 m depth and continued to 450 m, where it reached equilibrium with the gaseous phase. Measurements indicated that methane occupied 0%–9% by volume in the GHSZ, and ~12% in the gaseous zone.

In the less common second type found near the sediment surface, some samples have a higher proportion of longer-chain hydrocarbons (< 99% methane) contained in a structure II clathrate. Carbon from this type of clathrate is isotopically heavier (δ^{13}C is −29 to −57 ‰) and is thought to have migrated upwards from deep sediments, where methane was formed by thermal decomposition of organic matter. Examples of this type of deposit have been found in the Gulf of Mexico and the Caspian Sea.

Some deposits have characteristics intermediate between the microbially and thermally sourced types and are considered formed from a mixture of the two.

The methane in gas hydrates is dominantly generated by microbial consortia degrading organic matter in low oxygen environments, with the methane itself produced by methanogenic archaea. Organic matter in the uppermost few centimeters of sediments is first attacked by aerobic bacteria, generating CO_{2}, which escapes from the sediments into the water column. Below this region of aerobic activity, anaerobic processes take over, including, successively with depth, the microbial reduction of nitrite/nitrate, metal oxides, and then sulfates are reduced to sulfides. Finally, methanogenesis becomes a dominant pathway for organic carbon remineralization.

If the sedimentation rate is low (about 1 cm/yr), the organic carbon content is low (about 1%), and oxygen is abundant, aerobic bacteria can use up all the organic matter in the sediments faster than oxygen is depleted, so lower-energy electron acceptors are not used. But where sedimentation rates and the organic carbon content are high, which is typically the case on continental shelves and beneath western boundary current upwelling zones, the pore water in the sediments becomes anoxic at depths of only a few centimeters or less. In such organic-rich marine sediments, sulfate becomes the most important terminal electron acceptor due to its high concentration in seawater. However, it too is depleted by a depth of centimeters to meters. Below this, methane is produced. This production of methane is a rather complicated process, requiring a highly reducing environment (Eh −350 to −450 mV) and a pH between 6 and 8, as well as a complex syntrophic, consortia of different varieties of archaea and bacteria. However, it is only archaea that actually emit methane.

In some regions (e.g., Gulf of Mexico, Joetsu Basin) methane in clathrates may be at least partially derive from thermal degradation of organic matter (e.g. petroleum generation), with oil even forming an exotic component within the hydrate itself that can be recovered when the hydrate is disassociated. The methane in clathrates typically has a biogenic isotopic signature and highly variable δ^{13}C (−40‰ to −100‰), with an approximate average of about −65‰. Below the zone of solid clathrates, large volumes of methane may form bubbles of free gas in the sediments.

The presence of clathrates at a given site can often be determined by observation of a bottom simulating reflector (BSR), which is a seismic reflection at the sediment to clathrate stability zone interface caused by the unequal densities of normal sediments and those laced with clathrates.

Gas hydrate pingos have been discovered in the Arctic oceans Barents sea. Methane is bubbling from these dome-like structures, with some of these gas flares extending close to the sea surface.

==== Reservoir size ====
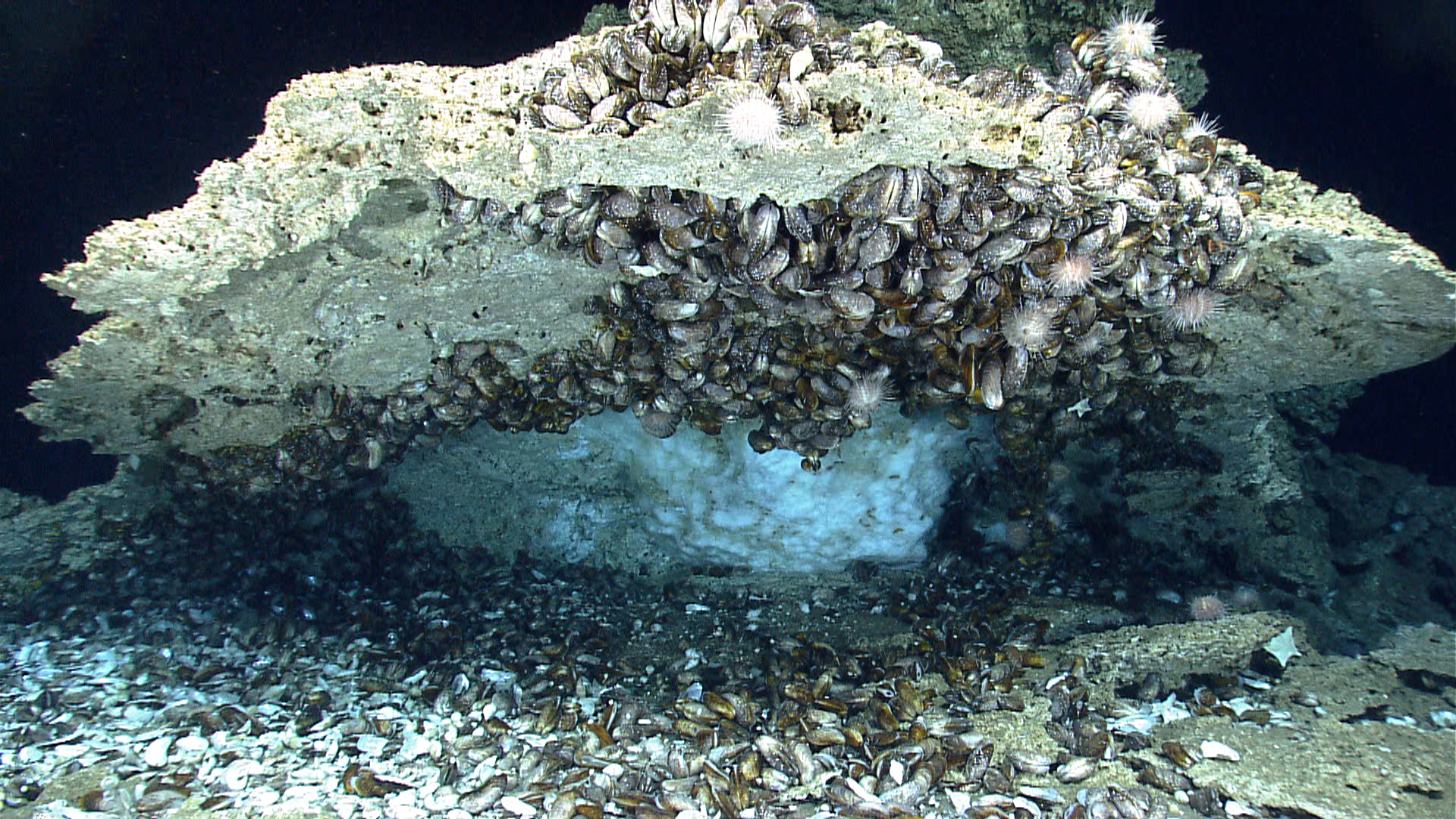
Gas hydrate under carbonate rock on the seafloor of the northern Gulf of Mexico

The size of the oceanic methane clathrate reservoir is poorly known, and estimates of its size decreased by roughly an order of magnitude per decade since it was first recognized that clathrates could exist in the oceans during the 1960s and 1970s. The highest estimates (e.g. 3×10^{18} m^{3}) were based on the assumption that fully dense clathrates could litter the entire floor of the deep ocean. Improvements in our understanding of clathrate chemistry and sedimentology have revealed that hydrates form in only a narrow range of depths (continental shelves), at only some locations in the range of depths where they could occur (10-30% of the Gas hydrate stability zone), and typically are found at low concentrations (0.9%–1.5% by volume) at sites where they do occur. Recent estimates constrained by direct sampling suggest the global inventory occupies between 1×10^{15} and 5×10^{15} cubic metres (0.24 and 1.2 million cubic miles). This estimate, corresponding to 500–2500 gigatonnes carbon (Gt C), is smaller than the 5000 Gt C estimated for all other geo-organic fuel reserves but substantially larger than the ~230 Gt C estimated for other natural gas sources. The permafrost reservoir has been estimated at about 400 Gt C in the Arctic, but no estimates have been made of possible Antarctic reservoirs. These are large amounts. In comparison, the total carbon in the atmosphere is around 800 gigatons (see Carbon § Occurrence).

These modern estimates are notably smaller than the 10000 to 11000 Gt C (2×10^{16} m^{3}) proposed by previous researchers as a reason to consider clathrates to be a geo-organic fuel resource (MacDonald 1990, Kvenvolden 1998). Lower abundances of clathrates do not rule out their economic potential, but a lower total volume and apparently low concentration at most sites does suggest that only a limited percentage of clathrates deposits may provide an economically viable resource.

=== Continental ===
Methane clathrates in continental rocks are trapped in beds of sandstone or siltstone at depths of less than 800 m. Sampling indicates they are formed from a mix of thermally and microbially derived gas from which the heavier hydrocarbons were later selectively removed. These occur in Alaska, Siberia, and Northern Canada.

In 2008, Canadian and Japanese researchers extracted a constant stream of natural gas from a test project at the Mallik gas hydrate site in the Mackenzie River delta. This was the second such drilling at Mallik: the first took place in 2002 and used heat to release methane. In the 2008 experiment, researchers were able to extract gas by lowering the pressure, without heating, requiring significantly less energy. The Mallik gas hydrate field was first discovered by Imperial Oil in 1971–1972.

=== Commercial use ===
Economic deposits of hydrate are termed natural gas hydrate (NGH) and store 164 m^{3} of methane, 0.8 m^{3} water in 1 m^{3} hydrate. Most NGH is found beneath the seafloor (95%) where it exists in thermodynamic equilibrium. The sedimentary methane hydrate reservoir probably contains 2–10 times the currently known reserves of conventional natural gas, as of 2013. This represents a potentially important future source of hydrocarbon fuel. However, in the majority of sites deposits are thought to be too dispersed for economic extraction. Other problems facing commercial exploitation are detection of viable reserves and development of the technology for extracting methane gas from the hydrate deposits.

In August 2006, China announced plans to spend 800 million yuan (US$100 million) over the next 10 years to study natural gas hydrates. A potentially economic reserve in the Gulf of Mexico may contain approximately 100 billion cubic metres (3.5×10^{12} cu ft) of gas. Bjørn Kvamme and Arne Graue at the Institute for Physics and technology at the University of Bergen have developed a method for injecting CO_{2} into hydrates and reversing the process; thereby extracting CH_{4} by direct exchange. The University of Bergen's method is being field tested by ConocoPhillips and state-owned Japan Oil, Gas and Metals National Corporation (JOGMEC), and partially funded by the U.S. Department of Energy. The project has already reached injection phase and was analyzing resulting data by March 12, 2012.

On March 12, 2013, JOGMEC researchers announced that they had successfully extracted natural gas from frozen methane hydrate. In order to extract the gas, specialized equipment was used to drill into and depressurize the hydrate deposits, causing the methane to separate from the ice. The gas was then collected and piped to surface where it was ignited to prove its presence. According to an industry spokesperson, "It [was] the world's first offshore experiment producing gas from methane hydrate". Previously, gas had been extracted from onshore deposits, but never from offshore deposits which are much more common. The hydrate field from which the gas was extracted is located 50 kilometres (31 mi) from central Japan in the Nankai Trough, 300 metres (980 ft) under the sea. A spokesperson for JOGMEC remarked "Japan could finally have an energy source to call its own". Marine geologist Mikio Satoh remarked "Now we know that extraction is possible. The next step is to see how far Japan can get costs down to make the technology economically viable." Japan estimates that there are at least 1.1 trillion cubic meters of methane trapped in the Nankai Trough, enough to meet the country's needs for more than ten years.

Both Japan and China announced in May 2017 a breakthrough for mining methane clathrates, when they extracted methane from hydrates in the South China Sea. China described the result as a breakthrough; Praveen Linga from the Department of Chemical and Biomolecular Engineering at the National University of Singapore agreed "Compared with the results we have seen from Japanese research, the Chinese scientists have managed to extract much more gas in their efforts". Industry consensus is that commercial-scale production remains years away.

=== Environmental concerns ===
Experts caution that environmental impacts are still being investigated and that methane—a greenhouse gas with around 81.2 times as much global warming potential over a 20-year period (GWP20) as carbon dioxide—could potentially escape into the atmosphere if something goes wrong. As methane has a much shorter atmospheric lifetime than carbon dioxide, its GWP is much less over longer time periods, with a GWP-100 of 27.9 and a GWP-500 of 7.95.

== Hydrates in natural gas processing ==
=== Routine operations ===
Methane clathrates (hydrates) are also commonly formed during natural gas production operations, when liquid water is condensed in the presence of methane at high pressure. It is known that larger hydrocarbon molecules like ethane and propane can also form hydrates, although longer molecules (butanes, pentanes) cannot fit into the water cage structure and tend to destabilise the formation of hydrates.

Once formed, hydrates can block pipeline and processing equipment. They are generally then removed by reducing the pressure, heating them, or dissolving them by chemical means (methanol is commonly used). Care must be taken to ensure that the removal of the hydrates is carefully controlled, because of the potential for the hydrate to undergo a phase transition from the solid hydrate to release water and gaseous methane at a high rate when the pressure is reduced. The rapid release of methane gas in a closed system can result in a rapid increase in pressure.

It is generally preferable to prevent hydrates from forming or blocking equipment. This is commonly achieved by removing water, or by the addition of ethylene glycol (MEG) or methanol, which act to depress the temperature at which hydrates will form. In recent years, development of other forms of hydrate inhibitors have been developed, like Kinetic Hydrate Inhibitors (increasing the required sub-cooling which hydrates require to form, at the expense of increased hydrate formation rate) and anti-agglomerates, which do not prevent hydrates forming, but do prevent them sticking together to block equipment.

=== Effect of hydrate phase transition during deep water drilling ===
When drilling in oil- and gas-bearing formations submerged in deep water, the reservoir gas may flow into the well bore and form gas hydrates owing to the low temperatures and high pressures found during deep water drilling. The gas hydrates may then flow upward with drilling mud or other discharged fluids. When the hydrates rise, the pressure in the annulus decreases and the hydrates dissociate into gas and water. The rapid gas expansion ejects fluid from the well, reducing the pressure further, which leads to more hydrate dissociation and further fluid ejection. The resulting violent expulsion of fluid from the annulus is one potential cause or contributor to the "kick". (Kicks, which can cause blowouts, typically do not involve hydrates: see Blowout (well drilling) § Formation kick).

Measures which reduce the risk of hydrate formation include:

- High flow-rates, which limit the time for hydrate formation in a volume of fluid, thereby reducing the kick potential.
- Careful measuring of line flow to detect incipient hydrate plugging.
- Additional care in measuring when gas production rates are low and the possibility of hydrate formation is higher than at relatively high gas flow rates.
- Monitoring of well casing after it is "shut in" (isolated) may indicate hydrate formation. Following "shut in", the pressure rises while gas diffuses through the reservoir to the bore hole; the rate of pressure rise exhibit a reduced rate of increase while hydrates are forming.
- Additions of energy (e.g., the energy released by setting cement used in well completion) can raise the temperature and convert hydrates to gas, producing a "kick".

=== Blowout recovery ===
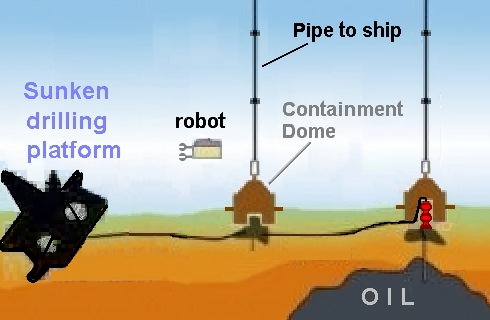
Concept diagram of oil containment domes, forming upside-down funnels in order to pipe oil to surface ships. The sunken oil rig is nearby.

At sufficient depths, methane complexes directly with water to form methane hydrates, as was observed during the Deepwater Horizon oil spill in 2010. BP engineers developed and deployed a subsea oil recovery system over oil spilling from a deepwater oil well 5,000 feet (1,500 m) below sea level to capture escaping oil. This involved placing a 125-tonne (276,000 lb) dome over the largest of the well leaks and piping it to a storage vessel on the surface. This option had the potential to collect some 85% of the leaking oil but was previously untested at such depths. BP deployed the system on May 7–8, but it failed due to a buildup of methane clathrate inside the dome; with its low density of approximately 0.9 g/cm^{3} the methane hydrates accumulated in the dome, adding buoyancy and obstructing flow.

== Methane clathrates and climate change ==
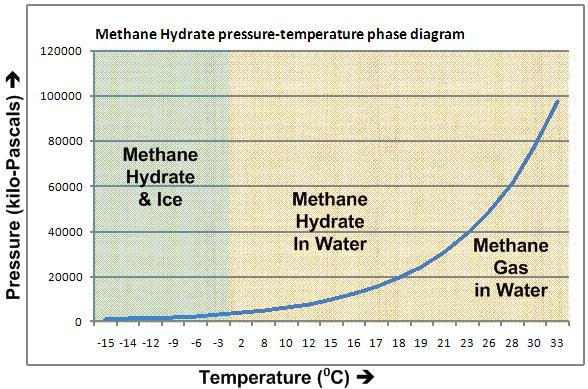
Methane clathrate is released as gas into the surrounding water column or soils when ambient temperature increases.

The clathrate gun hypothesis is a proposed explanation for the periods of rapid warming during the Quaternary. The hypothesis is that changes in fluxes in upper intermediate waters in the ocean caused temperature fluctuations that alternately accumulated and occasionally released methane clathrate on upper continental slopes. This would have had an immediate impact on the global temperature, as methane is a much more powerful greenhouse gas than carbon dioxide. Despite its atmospheric lifetime of around 12 years, methane's global warming potential is 72 times greater than that of carbon dioxide over 20 years, and 25 times over 100 years (33 when accounting for aerosol interactions). It is further proposed that these warming events caused the Bond cycles and individual interstadial events, such as the Dansgaard–Oeschger interstadials.

Most deposits of methane clathrate are in sediments too deep to respond rapidly, and 2007 modelling by Archer suggests that the methane forcing derived from them should remain a minor component of the overall greenhouse effect. Clathrate deposits destabilize from the deepest part of their stability zone, which is typically hundreds of metres below the seabed. A sustained increase in sea temperature will warm its way through the sediment eventually, and cause the shallowest, most marginal clathrate to start to break down; but it will typically take on the order of a thousand years or more for the temperature change to get that far into the seabed. Further, subsequent research on midlatitude deposits in the Atlantic and Pacific Ocean found that any methane released from the seafloor, no matter the source, fails to reach the atmosphere once the depth exceeds 430 m (1,411 ft), while geological characteristics of the area make it impossible for hydrates to exist at depths shallower than 550 m (1,804 ft).

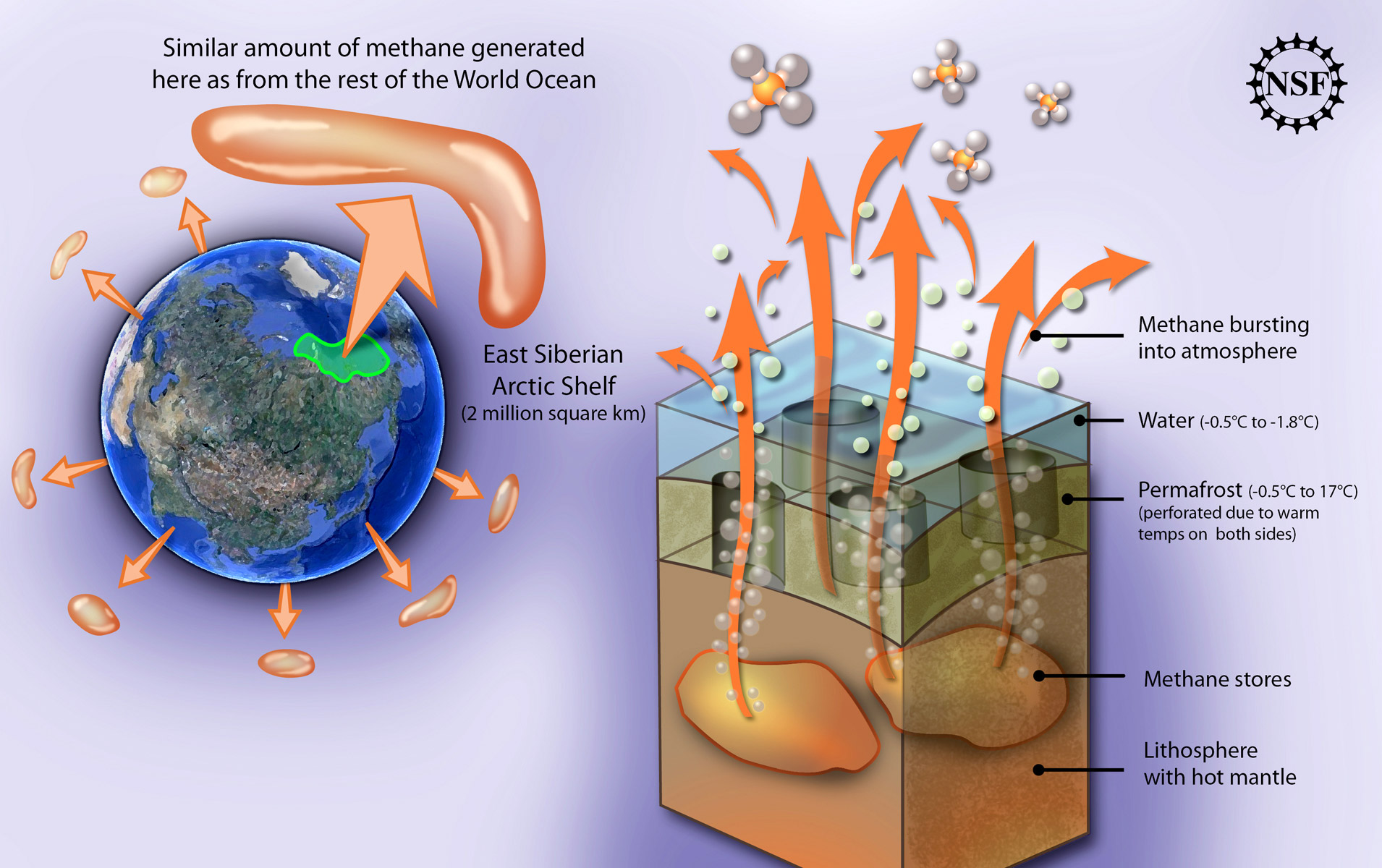
Potential Methane release in the Eastern Siberian Arctic Shelf

However, some methane clathrates deposits in the Arctic are much shallower than the rest, which could make them far more vulnerable to warming. A trapped gas deposit on the continental slope off Canada in the Beaufort Sea, located in an area of small conical hills on the ocean floor is just 290 m (951 ft) below sea level and considered the shallowest known deposit of methane hydrate. However, the East Siberian Arctic Shelf averages 45 meters in depth, and it is assumed that below the seafloor, sealed by sub-sea permafrost layers, hydrates deposits are located. This would mean that when the warming potentially talik or pingo-like features within the shelf, they would also serve as gas migration pathways for the formerly frozen methane, and a lot of attention has been paid to that possibility. Shakhova et al. (2008) estimate that not less than 1,400 gigatonnes of carbon is presently locked up as methane and methane hydrates under the Arctic submarine permafrost, and 5–10% of that area is subject to puncturing by open talik. Their paper initially included the line that the "release of up to 50 gigatonnes of predicted amount of hydrate storage [is] highly possible for abrupt release at any time". A release on this scale would increase the methane content of the planet's atmosphere by a factor of twelve, equivalent in greenhouse effect to a doubling in the 2008 level of CO_{2}.

This is what led to the original clathrate gun hypothesis, and in 2008 the United States Department of Energy National Laboratory system and the United States Geological Survey's Climate Change Science Program both identified potential clathrate destabilization in the Arctic as one of four most serious scenarios for abrupt climate change, which have been singled out for priority research. The USCCSP released a report in late December 2008 estimating the gravity of this risk. A 2012 study of the effects for the original hypothesis, based on a coupled climate–carbon cycle model (GCM) assessed a 1000-fold (from <1 to 1000 ppmv) methane increase—within a single pulse, from methane hydrates (based on carbon amount estimates for the PETM, with ~2000 GtC), and concluded it would increase atmospheric temperatures by more than 6 °C within 80 years. Further, carbon stored in the land biosphere would decrease by less than 25%, suggesting a critical situation for ecosystems and farming, especially in the tropics. Another 2012 assessment of the literature identifies methane hydrates on the Shelf of East Arctic Seas as a potential trigger.

A risk of seismic activity being potentially responsible for mass methane releases has been considered as well. In 2012, seismic observations destabilizing methane hydrate along the continental slope of the eastern United States, following the intrusion of warmer ocean currents, suggests that underwater landslides could release methane. The estimated amount of methane hydrate in this slope is 2.5 gigatonnes (about 0.2% of the amount required to cause the PETM), and it is unclear if the methane could reach the atmosphere. However, the authors of the study caution: "It is unlikely that the western North Atlantic margin is the only area experiencing changing ocean currents; our estimate of 2.5 gigatonnes of destabilizing methane hydrate may therefore represent only a fraction of the methane hydrate currently destabilizing globally." Bill McGuire notes, "There may be a threat of submarine landslides around the margins of Greenland, which are less well explored. Greenland is already uplifting, reducing the pressure on the crust beneath and also on submarine methane hydrates in the sediment around its margins, and increased seismic activity may be apparent within decades as active faults beneath the ice sheet are unloaded. This could provide the potential for the earthquake or methane hydrate destabilisation of submarine sediment, leading to the formation of submarine slides and, perhaps, tsunamis in the North Atlantic."

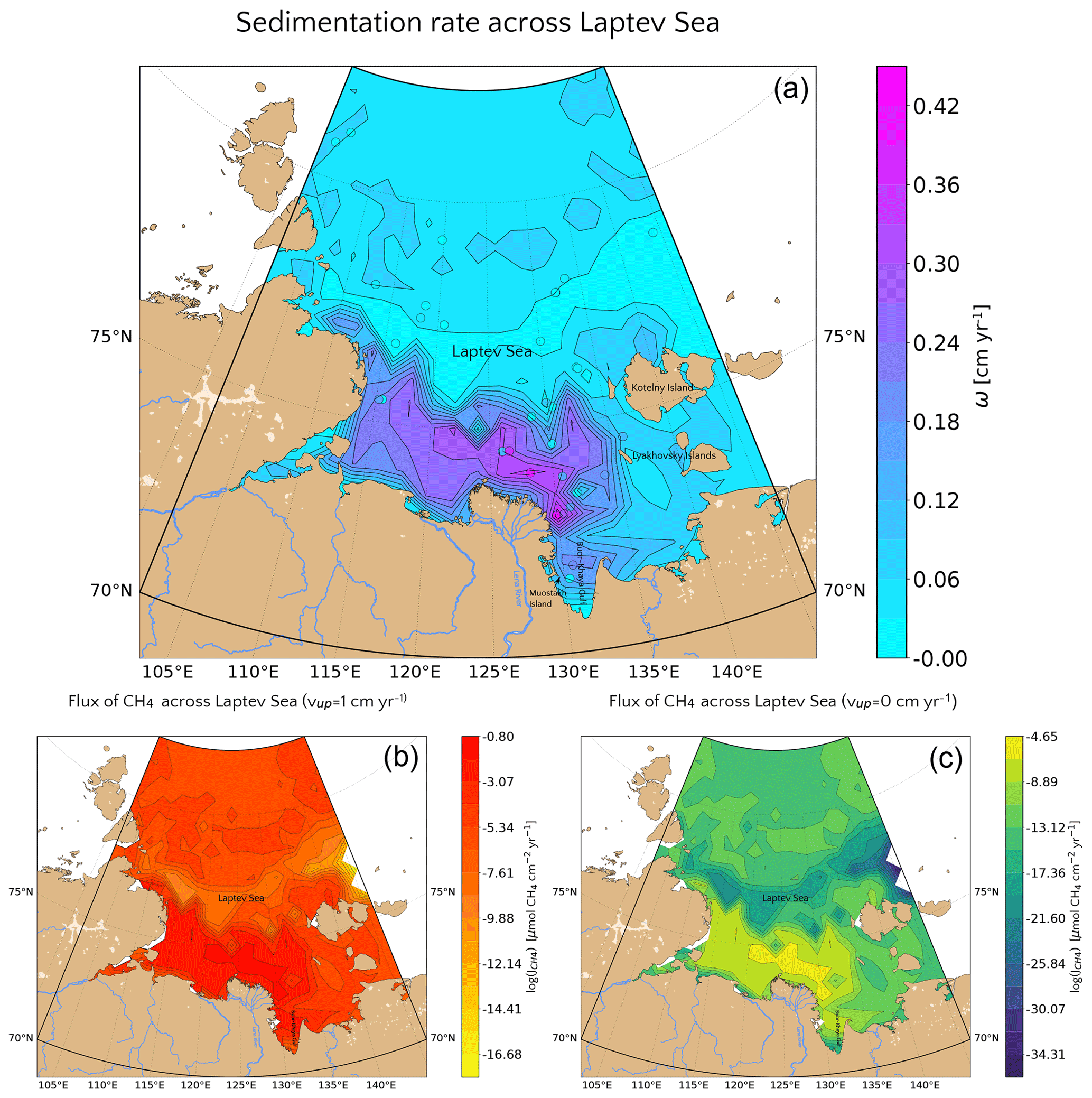
Methane releases in Laptev Sea are typically consumed within the sediment by methanotrophs. Areas with high sedimentation (top) subject their microbial communities to continual disturbance, and so they are the most likely to see active fluxes, whether with (right) or without active upward flow (left). Even so, the annual release may be limited to 1000 tonnes or less.

Research carried out in 2008 in the Siberian Arctic showed methane releases on the annual scale of millions of tonnes, which was a substantial increase on the previous estimate of 0.5 millions of tonnes per year. apparently through perforations in the seabed permafrost, with concentrations in some regions reaching up to 100 times normal levels. The excess methane has been detected in localized hotspots in the outfall of the Lena River and the border between the Laptev Sea and the East Siberian Sea. At the time, some of the melting was thought to be the result of geological heating, but more thawing was believed to be due to the greatly increased volumes of meltwater being discharged from the Siberian rivers flowing north.

By 2013, the same team of researchers used multiple sonar observations to quantify the density of bubbles emanating from subsea permafrost into the ocean (a process called ebullition), and found that 100–630 mg methane per square meter is emitted daily along the East Siberian Arctic Shelf (ESAS), into the water column. They also found that during storms, when wind accelerates air-sea gas exchange, methane levels in the water column drop dramatically. Observations suggest that methane release from seabed permafrost will progress slowly, rather than abruptly. However, Arctic cyclones, fueled by global warming, and further accumulation of greenhouse gases in the atmosphere could contribute to more rapid methane release from this source. Altogether, their updated estimate had now amounted to 17 millions of tonnes per year.

However, these findings were soon questioned, as this rate of annual release would mean that the ESAS alone would account for between 28% and 75% of the observed Arctic methane emissions, which contradicts many other studies. In January 2020, it was found that the rate at which methane enters the atmosphere after it had been released from the shelf deposits into the water column had been greatly overestimated, and observations of atmospheric methane fluxes taken from multiple ship cruises in the Arctic instead indicate that only around 3.02 million tonnes of methane are emitted annually from the ESAS. A modelling study published in 2020 suggested that under the present-day conditions, annual methane release from the ESAS may be as low as 1000 tonnes, with 2.6 – 4.5 million tonnes representing the peak potential of turbulent emissions from the shelf.

Hong et al. (2017) studied methane seepage in the shallow arctic seas at the Barents Sea close to Svalbard. Temperature at the seabed has fluctuated seasonally over the last century, between −1.8 °C (28.8 °F) and 4.8 °C (40.6 °F), it has only affected release of methane to a depth of about 1.6 meters at the sediment–water interface. Hydrates can be stable through the top 60 meters of the sediments and the current observed releases originate from deeper below the sea floor. They conclude that the increased methane flux started hundreds to thousands of years ago, noted about it, "..episodic ventilation of deep reservoirs rather than warming-induced gas hydrate dissociation." Summarizing his research, Hong stated:

The results of our study indicate that the immense seeping found in this area is a result of natural state of the system. Understanding how methane interacts with other important geological, chemical and biological processes in the Earth system is essential and should be the emphasis of our scientific community.

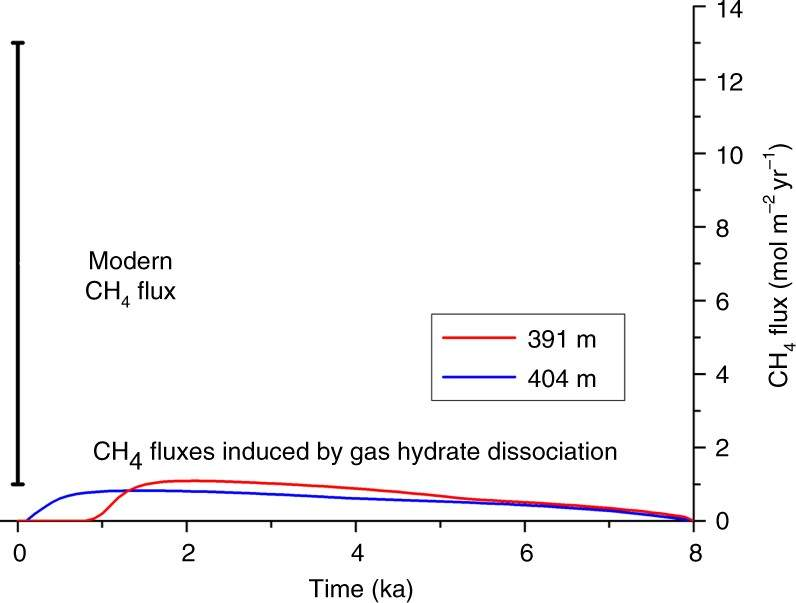
Methane releases specifically attributed to hydrate dissociation in the Svalbard appear to be much lower than the leaks from other methane sources.

Research by Wallmann et al. (2018) concluded that hydrate dissociation at Svalbard 8,000 years ago was due to isostatic rebound (continental uplift following deglaciation). As a result, the water depth got shallower with less hydrostatic pressure, without further warming. The study, also found that today's deposits at the site become unstable at a depth of ~ 400 meters, due to seasonal bottom water warming, and it remains unclear if this is due to natural variability or anthropogenic warming. Moreover, another paper published in 2017 found that only 0.07% of the methane released from the gas hydrate dissociation at Svalbard appears to reach the atmosphere, and usually only when the wind speeds were low. In 2020, a subsequent study confirmed that only a small fraction of methane from the Svalbard seeps reaches the atmosphere, and that the wind speed holds a greater influence on the rate of release than dissolved methane concentration on site.

Finally, a paper published in 2017 indicated that the methane emissions from at least one seep field at Svalbard were more than compensated for by the enhanced carbon dioxide uptake due to the greatly increased phytoplankton activity in this nutrient-rich water. The daily amount of carbon dioxide absorbed by the phytoplankton was 1,900 greater than the amount of methane emitted, and the negative (i.e. indirectly cooling) radiative forcing from the CO_{2} uptake was up to 251 times greater than the warming from the methane release.

In 2018, a perspective piece devoted to tipping points in the climate system suggested that the climate change contribution from methane hydrates would be "negligible" by the end of the century, but could amount to 0.4–0.5 °C (0.72–0.90 °F) on the millennial timescales. In 2021, the IPCC Sixth Assessment Report no longer included methane hydrates in the list of potential tipping points, and says that "it is very unlikely that CH_{4} emissions from clathrates will substantially warm the climate system over the next few centuries." The report had also linked terrestrial hydrate deposits to gas emission craters discovered in the Yamal Peninsula in Siberia, Russia beginning in July 2014, but noted that since terrestrial gas hydrates predominantly form at a depth below 200 meters, a substantial response within the next few centuries can be ruled out. Likewise, a 2022 assessment of tipping points described methane hydrates as a "threshold-free feedback" rather than a tipping point.

== Natural gas hydrates for gas storage and transportation ==
Since methane clathrates are stable at a higher temperature than liquefied natural gas (LNG) (−20 °C vs −162 °C), there is some interest in converting natural gas into clathrates (Solidified Natural Gas or SNG) rather than liquifying it when transporting it by seagoing vessels. A significant advantage would be that the production of natural gas hydrate (NGH) from natural gas at the terminal would require a smaller refrigeration plant and less energy than LNG would. Offsetting this, for 100 tonnes of methane transported, 750 tonnes of methane hydrate would have to be transported; since this would require a ship of 7.5 times greater displacement, or require more ships, it is unlikely to prove economically feasible. Recently, methane hydrate has received considerable interest for large scale stationary storage application due to the very mild storage conditions with the inclusion of tetrahydrofuran (THF) as a co-guest. With the inclusion of tetrahydrofuran, though there is a slight reduction in the gas storage capacity, the hydrates have been demonstrated to be stable for several months in a recent study at −2 °C and atmospheric pressure. A recent study has demonstrated that SNG can be formed directly with seawater instead of pure water in combination with THF.

== See also ==
- Future energy development
- Long-term effects of global warming
- The Swarm (Schätzing novel)
- Unconventional (oil & gas) reservoir
