= HSZ =

HSZ may refer to:

- Hsinchu Air Base, an airbase in Hsinchu City, Taiwan
- Hydrate stability zone
