= Methane chimney =

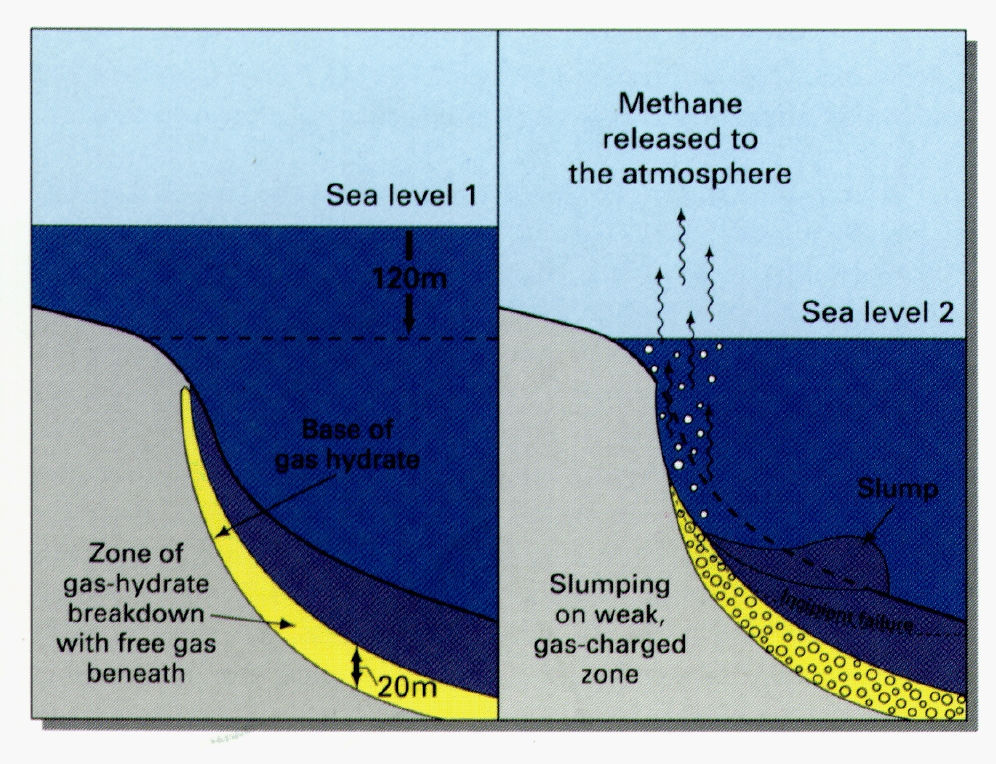
Illustration showing methane chimney from sea floor to surface.

A methane chimney or gas chimney is a rising column of natural gas, mainly methane, within a water or sediment column. The contrast in physical properties between the gas phase and the surrounding water makes such chimneys visible in oceanographic and geophysical data. In some cases, gas bubbles released at the seafloor may dissolve before they reach the ocean surface, but the increased hydrocarbon concentration may still be measured by chemical oceanographic techniques.

== Identification ==
In some locations along Russia's northern coast, methane rising from the sea floor to the surface has caused the sea to foam. However, most methane chimneys do not produce such visible signs at the sea surface. Instead, plumes are identified by a combination of chemical and physical oceanographic and geologic data. Plumes of methane bubbles, whether in the water column or subseafloor sediments, have lower density and sound speed than the surrounding water. As such, these plumes can be imaged by a variety of acoustic techniques, including seismic reflection data and conventional fishfinders. Dissolved methane is usually identified through widespread chemical analysis of water samples, including chromatography of gasses extracted from the headspace of seawater samples taken at depth (headspace is the space above a sample in a sealed container, which forms as higher temperature and lower pressure allows gasses to come out of solution). Continuous measurements of methane concentration in seawater can be made by underway ships using cavity ring-down spectroscopy.

== Association with climate change ==
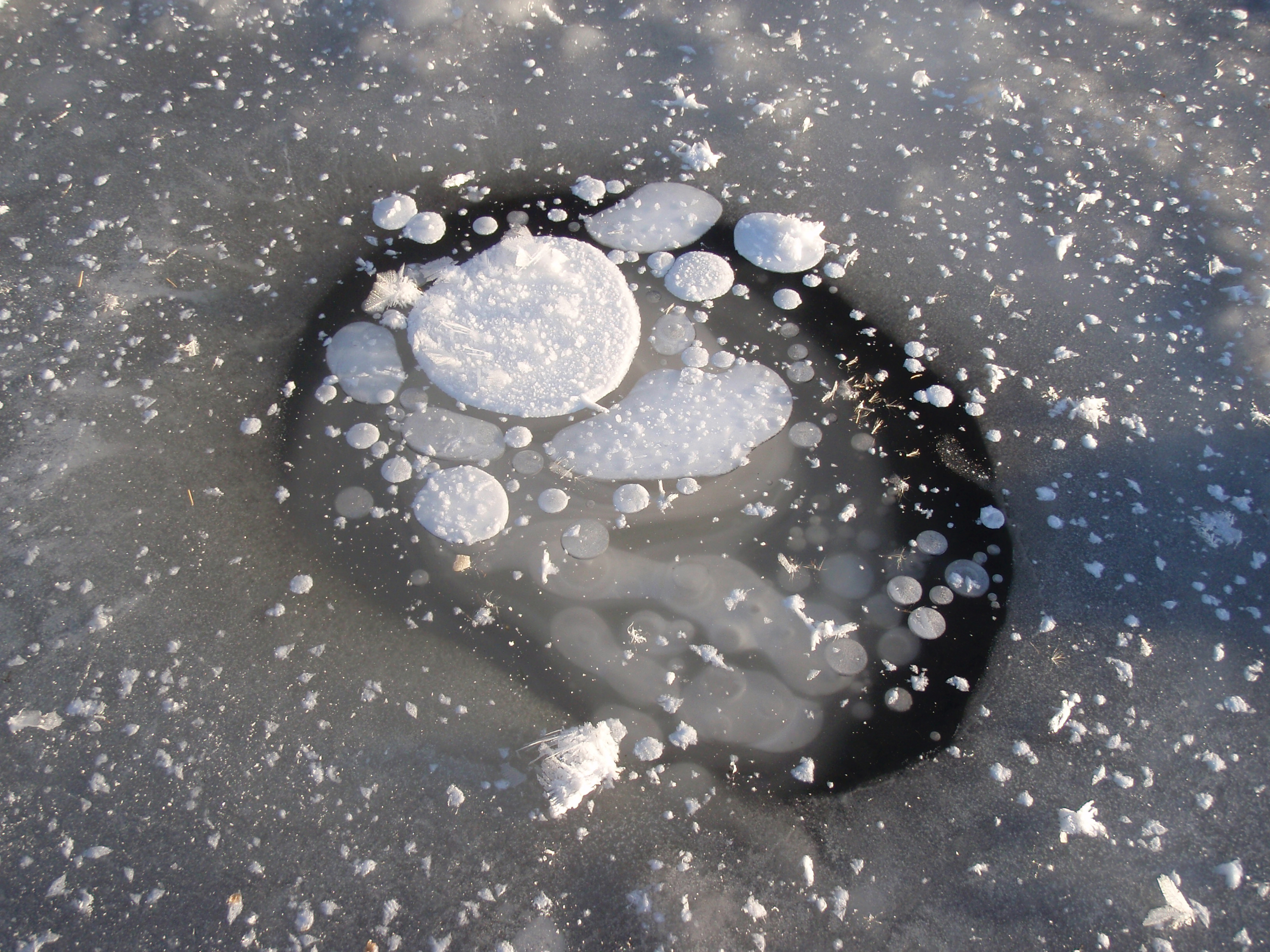
Frozen methane bubbles from thawing permafrost

Large deposits of frozen methane release gas into the environment when they thaw. In the case of sub-sea permafrost, the methane gas may dissolve in the seawater before reaching the surface; however, at a number of sites around the world, these methane chimneys release the gas directly into the atmosphere, contributing to global warming. Research teams in the Arctic measured concentrations of methane to be the highest ever recorded in the summertime. The thawing underwater permafrost is affecting methane release in two ways: thawing organic matter trapped in the permafrost releases methane and carbon dioxide as it decomposes, and methane in gas or solid form beneath the thawing permafrost seeps up through the now-soft soil and escapes into the atmosphere. As part of the International Siberian Shelf Study, which looked at arctic methane emissions, scientists found that concentrations of methane released from subsea chimneys and seeps were often 100 times higher than background levels. Methane has 20 times the heat-trapping capability of carbon dioxide.

== Marine life ==
Methane chimneys support marine life by creating chemical deposits that provide habitat for many organisms. These highly productive ecosystems occur in a wide range of marine geological settings across the world. Chimneys host organisms that feed on the methane and sulfide released from them. Life surrounding marine methane chimneys consumes 90% of the methane released, preventing it from entering the atmosphere. Microbes around methane chimneys form the basis of the food web; these microbes are chemolithotrophs, and thus do not require sunlight or oxygen to survive. Marine methane chimneys produce minerals that fertilize the ocean, creating spawning habitats for deep-sea sharks and other fish. They are also host to deep-sea crabs, shrimp, mussels, clams, and other shellfish. The ecosystems that these vents support remain largely unexplored.

== Petroleum provinces ==
In hydrocarbon exploration, gas chimneys revealed on seismic reflection data are indicators of active gas migration and a working petroleum system.

== Trees as methane chimneys ==
Trees in swampy, low-lying areas can conduct methane produced in soils up through their stems and out through their leaves. Other plants in bogs and marshes also act in this way. In the Amazon Rainforest, studies have described trees as a "massive chimney for pumping out methane". These findings estimated that the Amazon Rainforest emits around 40 million tons of methane per year, as much as the entire Arctic permafrost system. When large portions of the Amazon Basin flood, they create ideal conditions for high-level methane production. The methane flux is a result of abiotic factors such as soil moisture and climate. As seen in figure 2, the Quercus cerris tree in Hungary, a cool- climate plant that requires moderate soil moisture, can contain flammable concentrations of methane emitted from the stem.

Trees are not the only plants that act as methane chimneys. Studies have shown that species with greater root volume and biomass tend to exhibit a stronger chimney effect, and that raising the water table increases methane emissions from plants.

== Known sites ==
- North coast of Russia
- Golfo Dulce, Costa Rica
- Bering Sea
- Northern coast of Siberia
- Gulf of Cadiz
- Joetsu Basin, Japan

== See also ==
- Clathrate gun hypothesis
- Arctic methane release
- Methane clathrate
- Clathrate hydrate
- Runaway climate change
- Global warming
- Hydrothermal vent
