= Methane reservoir =

Methane reservoirs on Earth are mainly found in

- Oil and gas reservoirs as natural gas
- Coalbeds
- the seabed and the Arctic and other permafrost regions as methane clathrate
- the atmosphere
- decaying organic material

with the exact distribution so far determined by the methane cycle/carbon cycle.

Methane as the main ingredient of natural gas and as an extractable fossil fuel-energy resource has limited if significant reserves. Russia, Iran, and Qatar are topping the list with together 105.6 trillion cubic metres (3.73×10^{15} cu ft), nearly half the world's proven reserves. Methane from gas fields is an important factor in the world energy production and consumption. Methane clathrate is a potential future energy source, if it doesn't escape to the atmosphere before extraction because of global warming. In the atmosphere, it is not only unusable, but also a potent greenhouse gas, further accelerating the current climate change. But even conventional reservoirs are leaking methane (together with other gases like carbon dioxide) especially downstream the processing line.

== See also ==
- Natural gas storage
- Natural-gas condensate
