= Gas hydrate stability zone =

Aspect of the marine environment

Gas hydrate stability zone, abbreviated GHSZ, also referred to as methane hydrate stability zone (MHSZ) or hydrate stability zone (HSZ), refers to a zone and depth of the marine environment at which methane clathrates naturally exist in the Earth's crust.

== Description ==
Gas hydrate stability primarily depends upon temperature and pressure, however other variables such as gas composition and ionic impurities in water influence stability boundaries. The existence and depth of a hydrate deposit is often indicated by the presence of a bottom-simulating reflector (BSR). A BSR is a seismic reflection indicating the lower limit of hydrate stability in sediments due to the different densities of hydrate saturated sediments, normal sediments and those containing free gas.

== Limits ==
The upper and lower limits of the HSZ, as well as its thickness, depend upon the local conditions in which the hydrate occurs. The conditions for hydrate stability generally restrict natural deposits to polar regions and deep oceanic regions. In polar regions, due to low temperatures, the upper limit of the hydrate stability zone occurs at a depth of approximately 150 meters.^{1} The maximal depth of the hydrate stability zone is limited by the geothermal gradient. Along continental margins the average thickness of the HSZ is about 500 m. The upper limit in oceanic sediments occurs when bottom water temperatures are at or near 0 °C, and at a water depth of approximately 300 meters.^{1} The lower limit of the HSZ is bounded by the geothermal gradient. As depth below seafloor increases, the temperature eventually becomes too high for hydrates to exist. In areas of high geothermal heat flow, the lower limit of the HSZ may become shallower, therefore decreasing the thickness of the HSZ. Conversely, the thickest hydrate layers and widest HSZ are observed in areas of low geothermal heat flow. Generally, the maximum depth of HSZ extension is 2000 meters below the Earth's surface.^{1,3} Using the location of a BSR, as well as the pressure-temperature regimen necessary for hydrate stability, the HSZ may be used to determine geothermal gradients.^{2}

== Transport ==
If processes such as sedimentation or subduction transport hydrates below the lower limit of the HSZ, the hydrate becomes unstable and disassociates, releasing gas. This free gas may become trapped beneath the overlying hydrate layer, forming gas pockets, or reservoirs. The pressure from the presence of gas reservoirs impacts the stability of the hydrate layer. If this pressure is substantially changed, the stability of the methane layer above will be altered and may result in significant destabilization and disassociation of the hydrate deposit. Landslides of rock or sediment above the hydrate stability zone may also impact the hydrate stability. A sudden decrease in pressure can release gasses or destabilize portions of the hydrate deposit. Changing atmospheric and oceanic temperatures may impact the presence and depth of the hydrate stability zone, however, is still uncertain to what extent. In oceanic sediments, increasing pressure due to a rise in sea level may offset some of the impact of increasing temperature upon the hydrate stability equilibrium.^{1}
