= David Archer (scientist) =

American ocean chemist

David Edward Archer (born September 15, 1960) is a computational ocean chemist, and has been a professor at the Geophysical Sciences department at the University of Chicago since 1993. He has published research on the carbon cycle of the ocean and the sea floor. He has worked on the history of atmospheric CO_{2} concentration, the expectation of fossil fuel CO_{2} over geologic time scales in the future, and the impact of CO_{2} on future ice age cycles, ocean methane hydrate decomposition, and coral reefs. Archer is a contributor to the RealClimate blog.

== Teaching responsibilities ==
He teaches classes on global warming, environmental chemistry, and global geochemical cycles. He is the author of Global Warming: Understanding the Forecast, an introductory textbook on the environmental sciences for non-science undergraduates. He received the Quantrell Award for Excellence in Undergraduate Teaching.

== Education ==
He obtained his Ph.D. from the University of Washington in 1990.

== Books ==
- The Global Carbon Cycle (Princeton Primers in Climate), The Global Carbon Cycle (Princeton Primers in Climate)
- The Warming Papers: The Scientific Foundation for the Climate Change Forecast, 2010, edited with Raymond Pierrehumbert, ISBN 978-1-4051-9616-1, 432 pages
- The Long Thaw: How Humans Are Changing the Next 100,000 Years of Earth's Climate, 2008, ISBN 978-0-691-13654-7, 192 pages
- The Climate Crisis: An Introductory Guide to Climate Change, 2010, ISBN 978-0-521-73255-0, 260 pages
- Global Warming: Understanding the Forecast, 2006, ISBN 978-1-4051-4039-3, 208 pages
