= Bottom simulating reflector =

Anomalous reflections in marine seismic data

Bottom simulating reflectors (BSRs) are, on seismic reflection profiles, shallow seismic reflection events, characterized by their reflection geometry similar to seafloor bathymetry. They have, however, the opposite reflection polarity to the seabed reflection, and frequently intersect the primary reflections.

== Cause of Reflection ==
Seismic reflection is a sound wave bounced back from subsurface at the interface between media with different acoustic properties (density and wave velocity). In geology, the reflections normally occur at the contacts between different rocks, for example, between layers of sedimentary rocks (stratification). The acoustic properties of sedimentary rocks are influenced by their rock materials, pore space and fluid content. Reflections are generally parallel to sedimentary layering or bedding surfaces. Fluid content in pore space, however, sometimes becomes the dominant influence factor for the acoustic properties, therefore, reflections in such case, may not be parallel to bedding surfaces. BSRs are such a case of crossing bedding surfaces.

Drilling results show BSRs approximately marking the base of gas hydrated sediments below the seafloor and the reflection is primarily caused by the free gas contained in sediments below the gas hydrated section. Gas presence in sediments is well known for its drastically lowering the sediment acoustic impedance and hence, generates high amplitude reflection at the interface of gas bearing formation. Formation of gas hydrate in deep sea sediments depends on its ambient pressure and temperature, both which are largely influenced by the depth below seafloor. This is the primary reason for BSRs grossly parallel to the seafloor reflection on seismic profiles.

== Formation and Occurrence ==
Gas hydrates are made of molecules of natural gas, mostly biogenic or thermogenic methane, contained in solid water molecule lattice. They are formed by combining methane with water under elevated pressures and at relatively low temperatures. Hence BSRs are widespread in arctic permafrost regions and in shallow sedimentary columns below seabed in deepwater continental margins

== Application ==
=== Geological hazard studies ===
Identification of natural gas hydrate in deep sea sediments is crucial for offshore petroleum exploration. Without adequate equipment installed prior to drilling, blowout may occur if penetrating the gas hydrate sediments. Furthermore, presence of gas hydrates in marine sediments may alter sea floor stability, and induce submarine slumping.

=== Alternative energy resource ===
Although current production technology has not been proven to be commercially viable, gas hydrates’ global occurrence in deep sea sediments, have still been considered as a potential alternative energy resource. It should be pointed out that areal distribution of BSRs alone is not adequate to properly estimate the potential reserve, since other techniques are needed to address the thickness of sedimentary columns which contain the hydrates. In addition, seismic acquisition parameters and acoustic properties of sediments with free gas in pores may all influence acoustic impedance contrast, which inevitably affects the reflection amplitude. This would cause the uncertainty of the relationship between BSRs and the presence of gas hydrate.

=== Climatic impact ===
Because gas hydrates are only stable in a range of low temperatures and moderate pressures, atmospheric and ocean warming may trigger the hydrates instability and release significant amounts of methane from both permafrost and marine sediments. This could aggravate the greenhouse effect on the earth climate.
