= Bill McGuire (volcanologist) =

Volcanologist and academic (born 1954)

William J. McGuire (born 1954) is a volcanologist and Emeritus Professor of Geophysical & Climate Hazards at University College London. His main interests include volcano instability and lateral collapse, the nature and impact of global geophysical events and the effect of climate change on geological hazards.

== Background ==
McGuire studied at UCL and Luton College of Higher Education, now the University of Bedfordshire and has a PhD in Geology from University College London (1980). He began lecturing in Geology at the West London Institute of Higher Education in the 1980s, former home of well known TV geologist Iain Stewart. He was then appointed Reader at Cheltenham & Gloucester College of Higher Education (now the University of Gloucestershire), and made it into the university sector in the 1990s when he was appointed Professor of Geohazards and Director of the Aon Benfield UCL Hazard Research Centre at University College London. The centre is funded by the insurance industry. He relinquished the Directorship in 2011.

He was a member of the UK Government's Natural Hazard Working Group, established by Prime Minister Tony Blair following the 2004 Indian Ocean tsunami. In 2010 he was member of the Scientific Advisory Group for Emergencies (SAGE), to address problems following the eruptions of Eyjafjallajökull. He contributed to the IPCC summary report on extreme weather and disasters (2011).

McGuire lives in a geologically inactive area, Brassington in the Peak District, with his wife and two sons after many years in Hampton, Surrey.

== Research and work ==
McGuire is regarded as a UK expert on geological disasters including supervolcanoes, impact events, tsunamis and earthquakes.

He described Tokyo as "the city waiting to die", referring to its placement on a prominent geological fault that could result in a highly damaging earthquake. McGuire's main research sites are the Canary Islands, Mount Etna, and the Yellowstone National Park supervolcano in Wyoming.

In his book, Waking the Giant, he argues temperature change brought about by global warming could release pressure from melting ice caps (through post-glacial rebound) and trigger earthquakes and volcanic eruptions, as well as increased landslides resulting from heavier rainfall. See Physical impacts of climate change

McGuire is a Co-Director of the New Weather Institute, a co-op and think-tank "created to accelerate the rapid transition to a fair economy that thrives within planetary boundaries". He blogs for Extinction Rebellion and is a Special Scientific Advisor for The Word Forest Organisation.

In September 2023 McGuire appeared in British newspaper the i stating the economy and society would collapse by 2050 following riots due to lack of food, in part brought about by climate change. He likened the scenario to "the Wild West" with "gangs roaming the countryside".

== Media appearances ==
McGuire has appeared on many TV shows including Horizon, one of the BBCs most popular and successful "Science & Nature" programmes, Countdown to Doomsday on the Sci Fi Channel, and Decoding the Past ("Earth's Black Hole") on The History Channel.

== Publications ==
McGuire has written several academic and popular books on geohazards, earth sciences and geology, including:

- McGuire, W. (2022). Hothouse Earth: An Inhabitant’s Guide. Icon. ISBN 1785789201
- Simms, A. and W. McGuire (eds.). (2019). Knock Three Times: 28 modern folk tales for a world in trouble. New Weather Institute. ISBN 0995662355
- McGuire, W. (2012). Waking the Giant – How a Changing Climate Triggers Earthquakes, Tsunamis, and Volcanoes.
- McGuire, W. and Mark Maslin. (eds.) (2012). Climate Forcing of Geological Hazards. Wiley.
- McGuire, W. (2008). Seven Years to Save the Planet: The Questions and Answers (2008)
- McGuire, W. (2006). Global Catastrophes: A Very Short Introduction. Oxford University Press.
- McGuire, W. (2005). Surviving Armageddon: Solutions for a threatened planet. Oxford University Press. ISBN 019280572X
