= Sediment–water interface =

Boundary between bed sediment and the overlying water column

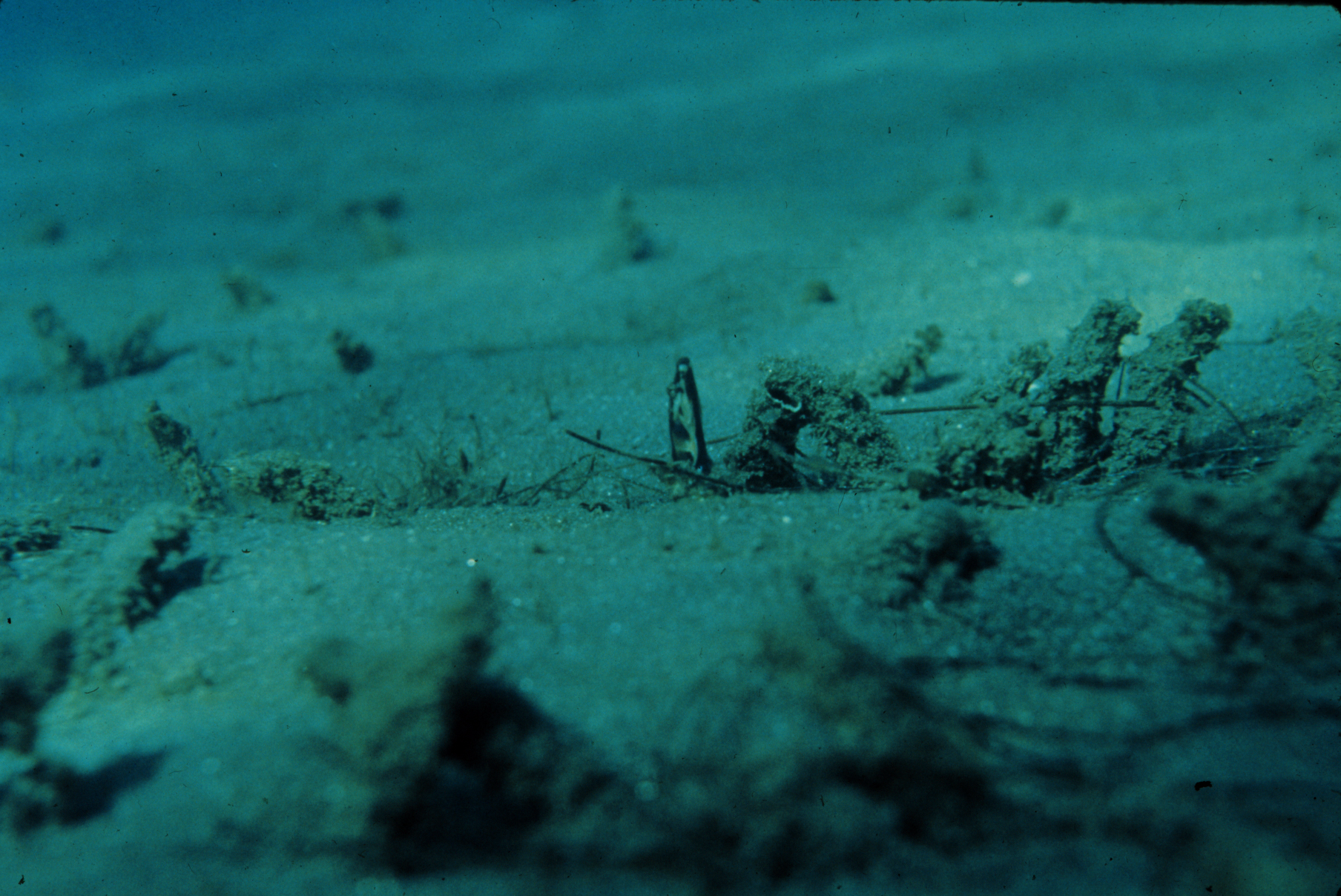
The flux of oxygenated water into and out of the sediments is mediated by bioturbation or mixing of the sediments, for example, via the construction of worm tubes.

In oceanography and limnology, the sediment–water interface is the boundary between bed sediment and the overlying water column. The term usually refers to a thin layer (approximately 1 cm deep, though variable) of water at the very surface of sediments on the seafloor. In the ocean, estuaries, and lakes, this layer interacts with the water above it through physical flow and chemical reactions mediated by the micro-organisms, animals, and plants living at the bottom of the water body. The topography of this interface is often dynamic, as it is affected by physical processes (e.g. currents causing rippling or resuspension) and biological processes (e.g. bioturbation generating mounds or trenches). Physical, biological, and chemical processes occur at the sediment-water interface as a result of a number of gradients such as chemical potential gradients, pore water gradients, and oxygen gradients.

== Definition ==
The location of the top of the sediment-water interface in the water column is defined as the break in the vertical gradient of some dissolved component, such as oxygen, where the concentration transitions from higher concentration in the well-mixed water above to a lower concentration at the sediment surface. This can include less than 1 mm to several mm of the water column.

== Physical processes ==
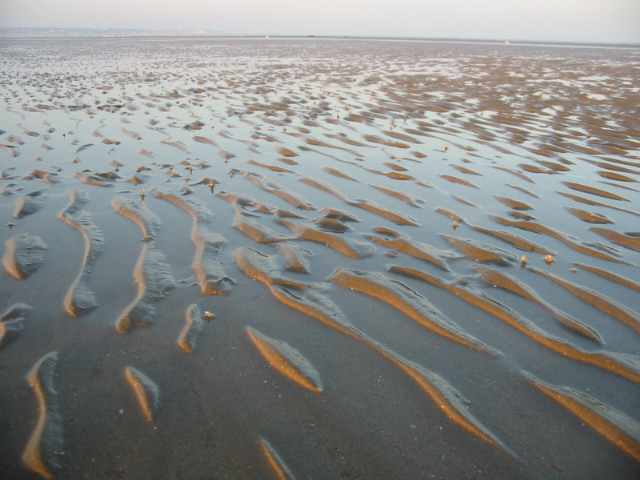
Waves and tidal currents can alter the topography of the sediment-water interface by forming sand ripples, like the ones shown here that are exposed at low tide.

Bioturbation mixes sediments and changes the topography of the sediment-water interface, as shown by time lapse photography of lugworms moving through sediment.

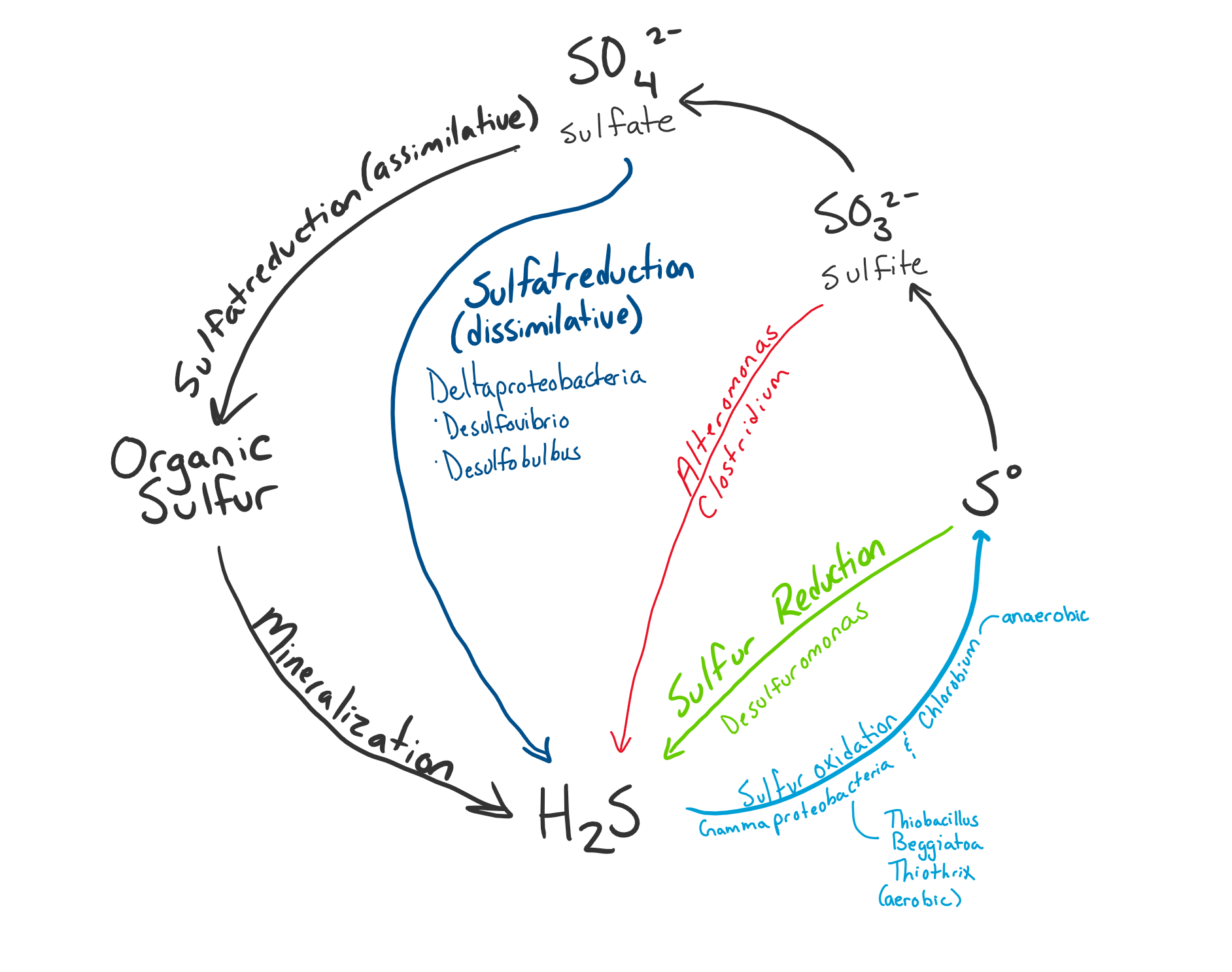
The sulfur cycle is a great example of lake nutrient cycling that occurs via biologically mediated processes as well as chemical redox reactions.

Physical movement of water and sediments alter the thickness and topography of the sediment-water interface. Sediment resuspension by waves, tides, or other disturbing forces (e.g. human feet at a beach) allows sediment pore water and other dissolved components to diffuse out of the sediments and mix with the water above. For resuspension to occur the movement of water has to be powerful enough to have a strong critical shear stress that is greater than the bed shear stress. For example, a very consolidated bed would only be resuspended under a high critical shear stress, while a "fluff layer" of very loose particles could be resuspended under a low critical shear stress. Depending on the type of lake, there can be a number of mixing events each year that can influence the sediment interface. Amictic lakes are permanently stratified, similarly, meromictic lakes do not mix. Polymictic lakes undergo frequent mixing and dimictic lakes mix twice a year. This type of lake mixing is a physical process that can be driven by overlaying winds, temperature differences, or shear stress within the lake.

Physical processes that affect the sediment-water interface include, but are not limited to:

- Resuspension
- Deposition
- Rippling (either small wave ripples or giant current ripples)
- Turbidity currents
- Bed consolidation

== Biological processes ==
Interactions between sediments and organisms living within sediments can also alter the fluxes of oxygen and other dissolved components in and out of the sediment-water interface. Animals like worms, mollusks and echinoderms can enhance resuspension and mixing through movement and construction of burrows. Microorganisms such as benthic algae can stabilize sediments and keep the sediment-water interface in a more stable condition by building mats. These microalgal mats' stabilizing effect is in part due to the stickiness of the exopolymeric substances (EPS) or biochemical "glue" that they secrete.

Biological processes that affect the sediment-water interface include, but are not limited to:

- Bioturbation
- Biofilms
- Bacterial use of different chemical "food" (see Redox reactions)
- Remineralization of organic carbon and detritus

== Chemical processes ==
There are several chemical processes that happen abiotically (chemical reactions), as well as biotically (microbial or enzyme mediated reactions). For example, oxidation-reduction (redox) reactions can occur simply through the reactions of elements, or by oxidizing/reducing bacteria. The transformations and turnover of elements between sediments and water occur through abiotic chemical processes and microbiological chemical processes.

=== Abiotic ===
Chemical reactions can occur at the sediment-water interface, abiotically. Examples of this would include the oxygenation of lake sediments as a function of free iron content in the sediment (i.e. pyrite formation in sediments), as well as sulfur availability via the sulfur cycle. Sedimentation is often the final scavenging process that takes trace chemicals and elements out of the water column. Sediments at this interface are more porous and can hold a larger volume of pore water in the interstitial sites due to high organic matter content and lack of settling. Therefore, chemical compounds in the water can undergo two main processes here: 1) diffusion and 2) biological mixing. Chemical diffusion into and out of the interstitial sites occurs primary through random molecular movement. While diffusion is the primary mode through which chemicals interact with the sediments, there are a number of physical mixing processes which facilitate this process (see Physical Processes section). Chemical fluxes are dependent on several gradients such as, pH and chemical potential. Based on a specific chemical's partitioning parameters, the chemical may stay suspended in the water column, partition to biota, partition to suspended solids, or partition into the sediment. In addition, Fick's first law of diffusion states that the rate of diffusion is a function of distance; as time goes on, the concentration profile becomes linear. The availability of a variety of lake contaminants is determined by which reactions are taking place within the freshwater system.

Chemical reactions at the sediment water interface are listed here below:

- Oxygen consumption- O_{2} --> H_{2}O
- Denitrification- NO_{3} --> N_{2}
- Manganese reduction- Mn^{IV} --> Mn^{II}
- Iron reduction- Fe^{III} --> Fe^{II}
- Sulfate reduction- SO_{4} --> HS
- Methane formation- CH_{2}O --> CO_{2}, CH_{4}

=== Biologically mediated ===
==== Lakes ====
When moving from the overlying waters to the sediment-water interface there is a 3-5 order of magnitude increase in the number of bacteria. While bacteria are present at the interface throughout the lake basin, their distributions and function vary with substrate, vegetation, and sunlight. For example, the bacterial population at the sediment-water interface in a vegetative littoral zone tends to be larger than the population of the deeper profundal zone, due to higher organic matter content in the former. And, a functional artifact of heavy vegetation at the interface might be a greater number of Azotobacter, a genus of bacteria that can fix N_{2} to ionic ammonium (NH_{4}^{+}).

Even though basin morphometry plays a role in the partitioning of bacteria within the lake, bacterial populations and functions are primarily driven by the availability of specific oxidants/electron acceptors (e.g., O_{2}, NO_{3}^{−}, SO_{4}^{−}, CO_{2}). These constituents, diffused from the overlying water or the underlying sediment, can be used and/or formed during bacterial metabolism by different organisms or be released back into the water column. The steep redox gradients present at/within the sediment-water interface allow for a variety of aerobic and anaerobic organisms to survive and a variety of redox transformations to take place. Here are just a few of the microbial-mediated redox reactions that can take place within the sediment water interface.

- Aerobic respiration
- Nitrogen fixation
- Denitrification [anammox]
- Manganese reduction
- Iron reduction
- Sulfate reduction
- Methanogenesis

== See also ==
- Anoxic waters
- Benthos
- Benthic zone
- Benthic boundary layer
- Biogeochemical cycle
- Marine sediment
- Nepheloid layer
- Seabed
- Sediment transport
