= Water model =

Aspect of computational chemistry

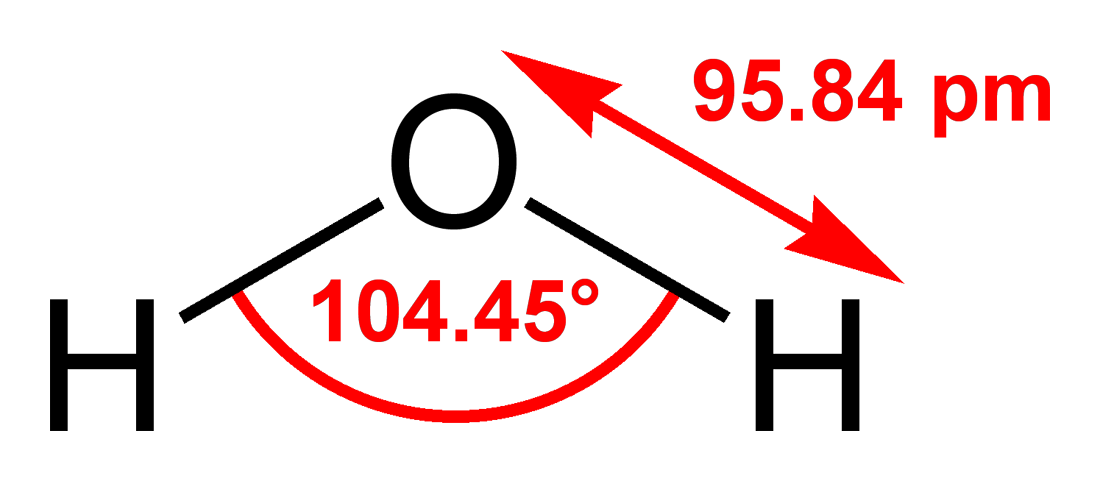
A water model is defined by its geometry, together with other parameters such as the atomic charges and Lennard-Jones parameters.

In computational chemistry, a water model is used to simulate and thermodynamically calculate water clusters, liquid water, and aqueous solutions with explicit solvent, often using molecular dynamics or Monte Carlo methods. The models describe intermolecular forces between water molecules and are determined from quantum mechanics, molecular mechanics, experimental results, and these combinations. To imitate the specific nature of the intermolecular forces, many types of models have been developed. In general, these can be classified by the following three characteristics; (i) the number of interaction points or sites, (ii) whether the model is rigid or flexible, and (iii) whether the model includes polarization effects.

An alternative to the explicit water models is to use an implicit solvation model, also termed a continuum model. Examples of this type of model include the COSMO solvation model, the polarizable continuum model (PCM) and hybrid solvation models.

== Simple water models ==
The rigid models are considered the simplest water models and rely on non-bonded interactions. In these models, bonding interactions are implicitly treated by holonomic constraints. The electrostatic interaction is modeled using Coulomb's law, and the dispersion and repulsion forces using the Lennard-Jones potential. The potential for models such as TIP3P (transferable intermolecular potential with 3 points) and TIP4P is represented by

$$E_{ab} = \sum_i^{\text{on }a} \sum_j^{\text{on }b}
\frac {k_C q_i q_j}{r_{ij}}
+ \frac {A}{r_{\text{OO}}^{12}}
- \frac {B}{r_{\text{OO}}^6},$$

where k_{C}, the electrostatic constant, has a value of 332.1 Å·kcal/(mol·e²) in the units commonly used in molecular modeling; q_{i} and q_{j} are the partial charges relative to the charge of the electron; r_{ij} is the distance between two atoms or charged sites; and A and B are the Lennard-Jones parameters. The charged sites may be on the atoms or on dummy sites (such as lone pairs). In most water models, the Lennard-Jones term applies only to the interaction between the oxygen atoms.

The figure below shows the general shape of the 3- to 6-site water models. The exact geometric parameters (the OH distance and the HOH angle) vary depending on the model.

== 2-site ==
A 2-site model of water based on the familiar three-site SPC model (see below) has been shown to predict the dielectric properties of water using site-renormalized molecular fluid theory.

== 3-site ==
Three-site models have three interaction points corresponding to the three atoms of the water molecule. Each site has a point charge, and the site corresponding to the oxygen atom also has the Lennard-Jones parameters. Since 3-site models achieve a high computational efficiency, these are widely used for many applications of molecular dynamics simulations. Most of the models use a rigid geometry matching that of actual water molecules. An exception is the SPC model, which assumes an ideal tetrahedral shape (HOH angle of 109.47°) instead of the observed angle of 104.5°.

The table below lists the parameters for some 3-site models.

	TIPS	SPC	TIP3P	SPC/E
r(OH), Å	0.9572	1.0	0.9572	1.0
HOH, deg	104.52	109.47	104.52	109.47
A, 10^{3} kcal Å^{12}/mol	580.0	629.4	582.0	629.4
B, kcal Å^{6}/mol	525.0	625.5	595.0	625.5
q(O)	−0.80	−0.82	−0.834	−0.8476
q(H)	+0.40	+0.41	+0.417	+0.4238

The SPC/E model adds an average polarization correction to the potential energy function:

$$E_\text{pol} = \frac 1 2 \sum_i
\frac{(\mu - \mu^0)^2}{\alpha_i},$$

where μ is the electric dipole moment of the effectively polarized water molecule (2.35 D for the SPC/E model), μ^{0} is the dipole moment of an isolated water molecule (1.85 D from experiment), and α_{i} is an isotropic polarizability constant, with a value of 1.608×10^{−40} F·m^{2}. Since the charges in the model are constant, this correction just results in adding 1.25 kcal/mol (5.22 kJ/mol) to the total energy. The SPC/E model results in a better density and diffusion constant than the SPC model.

The TIP3P model implemented in the CHARMM force field is a slightly modified version of the original. The difference lies in the Lennard-Jones parameters: unlike TIP3P, the CHARMM version of the model places Lennard-Jones parameters on the hydrogen atoms too, in addition to the one on oxygen. The charges are not modified. Three-site model (TIP3P) has better performance in calculating specific heats.

=== Flexible SPC water model ===
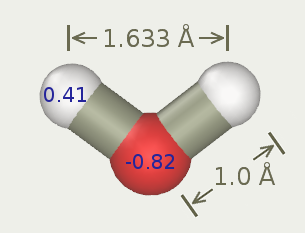
Flexible SPC water model

The flexible simple point-charge water model (or flexible SPC water model) is a re-parametrization of the three-site SPC water model. The SPC model is rigid, whilst the flexible SPC model is flexible. In the model of Toukan and Rahman, the O–H stretching is made anharmonic, and thus the dynamical behavior is well described. This is one of the most accurate three-center water models without taking into account the polarization. In molecular dynamics simulations it gives the correct density and dielectric permittivity of water.

Flexible SPC is implemented in the programs MDynaMix and Abalone.

=== Other models ===
- Ferguson (flexible SPC)
- CVFF (flexible)
- MG (flexible and dissociative)
- KKY potential (flexible model).
- BLXL (smear charged potential).

== 4-site ==
The four-site models have four interaction points by adding one dummy atom near of the oxygen along the bisector of the HOH angle of the three-site models (labeled M in the figure). The dummy atom only has a negative charge. This model improves the electrostatic distribution around the water molecule. The first model to use this approach was the Bernal–Fowler model published in 1933, which may also be the earliest water model. However, the BF model doesn't reproduce well the bulk properties of water, such as density and heat of vaporization, and is thus of historical interest only. This is a consequence of the parameterization method; newer models, developed after modern computers became available, were parameterized by running Metropolis Monte Carlo or molecular dynamics simulations and adjusting the parameters until the bulk properties are reproduced well enough.

The TIP4P model, first published in 1983, is widely implemented in computational chemistry software packages and often used for the simulation of biomolecular systems. There have been subsequent reparameterizations of the TIP4P model for specific uses: the TIP4P-Ew model, for use with Ewald summation methods; the TIP4P/Ice, for simulation of solid water ice; TIP4P/2005, a general parameterization for simulating the entire phase diagram of condensed water; and TIP4PQ/2005, a similar model but designed to accurately describe the properties of solid and liquid water when quantum effects are included in the simulation.

Most of the four-site water models use an OH distance and HOH angle which match those of the free water molecule. One exception is the OPC model, in which no geometry constraints are imposed other than the fundamental C_{2v} molecular symmetry of the water molecule. Instead, the point charges and their positions are optimized to best describe the electrostatics of the water molecule. OPC reproduces a comprehensive set of bulk properties more accurately than several of the commonly used rigid n-site water models. The OPC model is implemented within the AMBER force field.

	BF	TIPS2	TIP4P	TIP4P-Ew	TIP4P/Ice	TIP4P/2005	OPC	TIP4P-D
r(OH), Å	0.96	0.9572	0.9572	0.9572	0.9572	0.9572	0.8724	0.9572
HOH, deg	105.7	104.52	104.52	104.52	104.52	104.52	103.6	104.52
r(OM), Å	0.15	0.15	0.15	0.125	0.1577	0.1546	0.1594	0.1546
A, 10^{3} kcal Å^{12}/mol	560.4	695.0	600.0	656.1	857.9	731.3	865.1	904.7
B, kcal Å^{6}/mol	837.0	600.0	610.0	653.5	850.5	736.0	858.1	900.0
q(M)	−0.98	−1.07	−1.04	−1.04844	−1.1794	−1.1128	−1.3582	−1.16
q(H)	+0.49	+0.535	+0.52	+0.52422	+0.5897	+0.5564	+0.6791	+0.58

Others:

- q-TIP4P/F (flexible)
- TIP4P/2005f (flexible)

== 5-site ==
The 5-site models place the negative charge on dummy atoms (labelled L) representing the lone pairs of the oxygen atom, with a tetrahedral-like geometry. An early model of these types was the BNS model of Ben-Naim and Stillinger, proposed in 1971, soon succeeded by the ST2 model of Stillinger and Rahman in 1974. Mainly due to their higher computational cost, five-site models were not developed much until 2000, when the TIP5P model of Mahoney and Jorgensen was published. When compared with earlier models, the TIP5P model results in improvements in the geometry for the water dimer, a more "tetrahedral" water structure that better reproduces the experimental radial distribution functions from neutron diffraction, and the temperature of maximal density of water. The TIP5P-E model is a reparameterization of TIP5P for use with Ewald sums.

	BNS	ST2	TIP5P	TIP5P-E
r(OH), Å	1.0	1.0	0.9572	0.9572
HOH, deg	109.47	109.47	104.52	104.52
r(OL), Å	1.0	0.8	0.70	0.70
LOL, deg	109.47	109.47	109.47	109.47
A, 10^{3} kcal Å^{12}/mol	77.4	238.7	544.5	554.3
B, kcal Å^{6}/mol	153.8	268.9	590.3	628.2
q(L)	−0.19562	−0.2357	−0.241	−0.241
q(H)	+0.19562	+0.2357	+0.241	+0.241
R_{L}, Å	2.0379	2.0160		
R_{U}, Å	3.1877	3.1287		

Note, however, that the BNS and ST2 models do not use Coulomb's law directly for the electrostatic terms, but a modified version that is scaled down at short distances by multiplying it by the switching function S(r):

$$S(r_{ij}) =
\begin{cases}
0    & \text{if }r_{ij} \le R_\text{L}, \\
\frac{(r_{ij} - R_L)^2(3R_\text{U} - R_\text{L} - 2r_{ij})}{(R_\text{U} - R_\text{L})^2}  & \text{if }R_\text{L} \le r_{ij} \le R_\text{U}, \\
1 & \text{if }R_\text{U} \le r_{ij}.
\end{cases}$$

Thus, the R_{L} and R_{U} parameters only apply to BNS and ST2.

== 6-site ==
Originally designed to study water/ice systems, a 6-site model that combines all the sites of the 4- and 5-site models was developed by Nada and van der Eerden. Since it had a very high melting temperature when employed under periodic electrostatic conditions (Ewald summation), a modified version was published later optimized by using the Ewald method for estimating the Coulomb interaction.

== Other ==
- The effect of explicit solute model on solute behavior in biomolecular simulations has been also extensively studied. It was shown that explicit water models affected the specific solvation and dynamics of unfolded peptides, while the conformational behavior and flexibility of folded peptides remained intact.
- MB model. A more abstract model resembling the Mercedes-Benz logo that reproduces some features of water in two-dimensional systems. It is not used as such for simulations of "real" (i.e., three-dimensional) systems, but it is useful for qualitative studies and for educational purposes.
- Coarse-grained models. One- and two-site models of water have also been developed. In coarse-grain models, each site can represent several water molecules.
- Many-body models. Water models built using training-set configurations solved quantum mechanically, which then use machine learning protocols to extract potential-energy surfaces. These potential-energy surfaces are fed into MD simulations for an unprecedented degree of accuracy in computing physical properties of condensed phase systems.
  - Another classification of many body models is on the basis of the expansion of the underlying electrostatics, e.g., the SCME (Single Center Multipole Expansion) model

== Computational cost ==
The computational cost of a water simulation increases with the number of interaction sites in the water model. The CPU time is approximately proportional to the number of interatomic distances that need to be computed. For the 3-site model, 9 distances are required for each pair of water molecules (every atom of one molecule against every atom of the other molecule, or 3 × 3). For the 4-site model, 10 distances are required (every charged site with every charged site, plus the O–O interaction, or 3 × 3 + 1). For the 5-site model, 17 distances are required (4 × 4 + 1). Finally, for the 6-site model, 26 distances are required (5 × 5 + 1).

When using rigid water models in molecular dynamics, there is an additional cost associated with keeping the structure constrained, using constraint algorithms (although with bond lengths constrained it is often possible to increase the time step).

== See also ==
- Water (properties)
- Water (data page)
- Water dimer
- Force field (chemistry)
- Comparison of force field implementations
- Molecular mechanics
- Molecular modelling
- Comparison of software for molecular mechanics modeling
- Solvent models
