= Properties of water =

Physical and chemical properties of pure water

Water
- The water molecule has this basic geometric structure

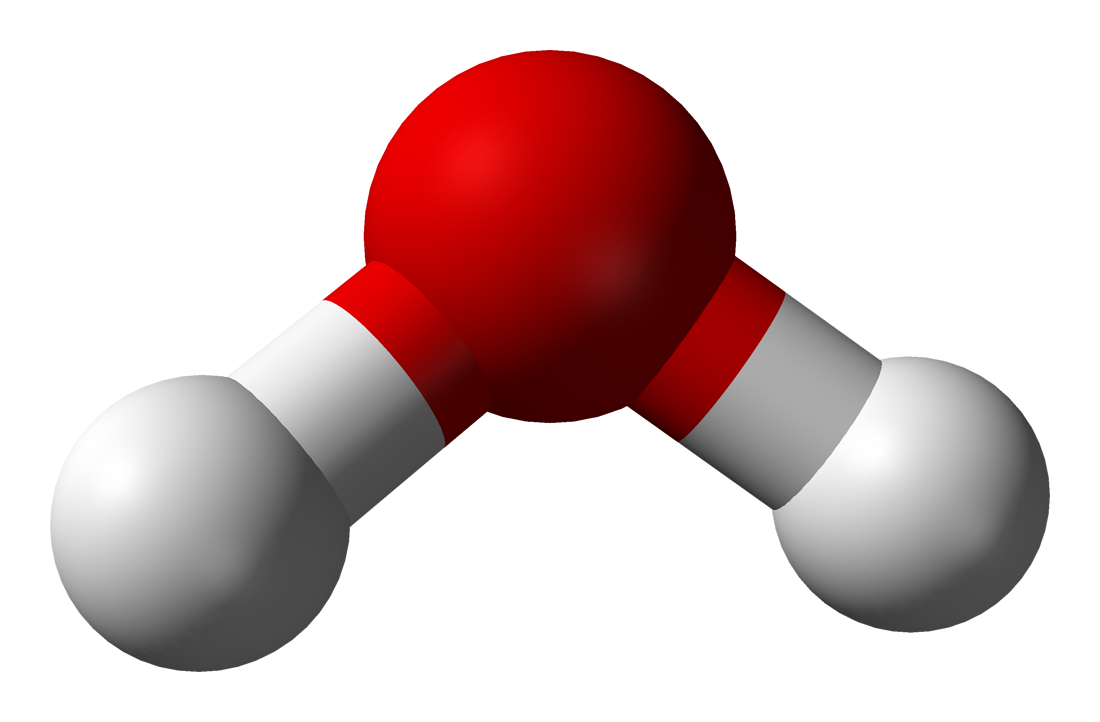
Ball-and-stick model of a water molecule
Space filling model of a water molecule
Oxygen, O
Hydrogen, H
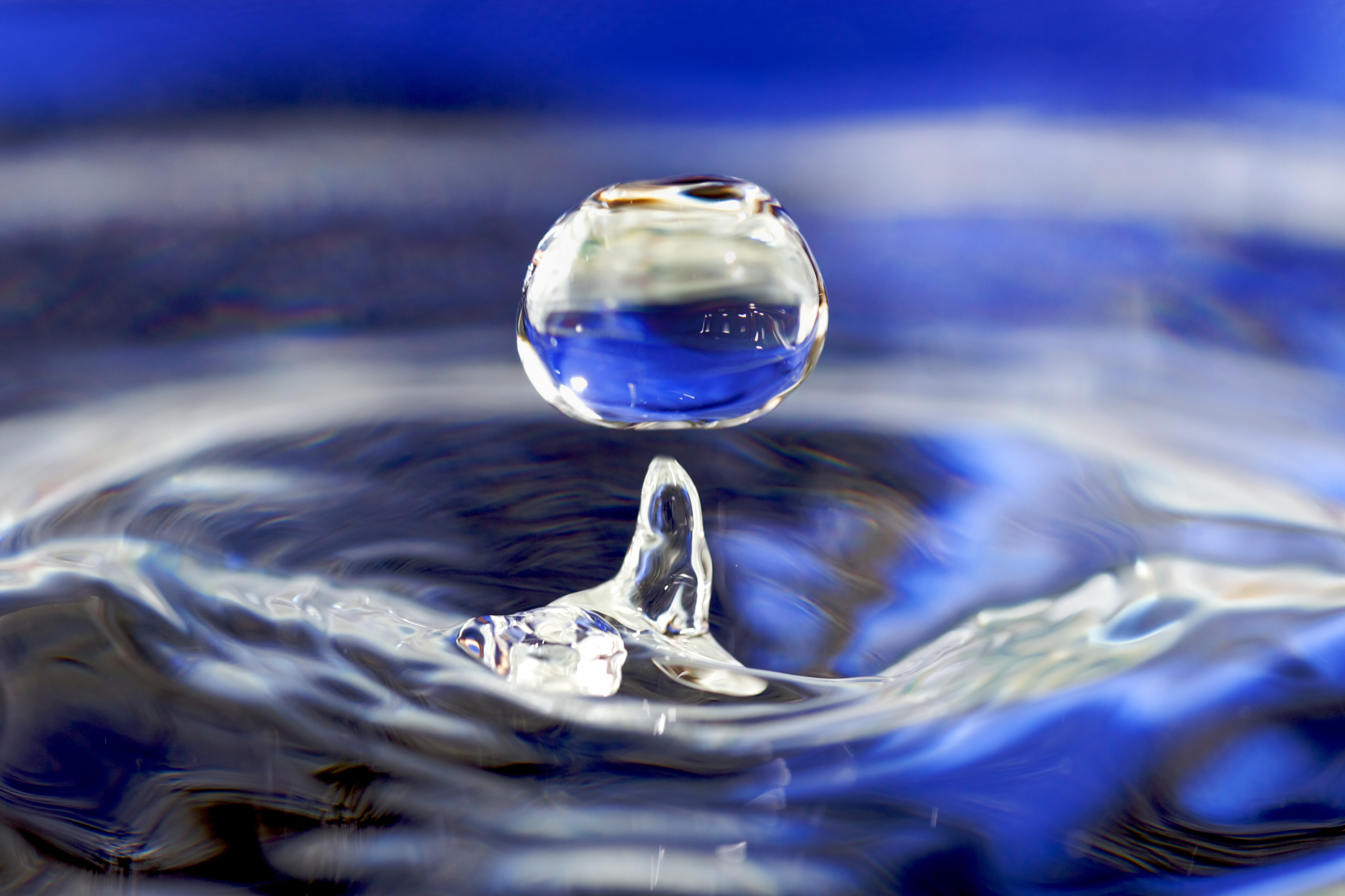
- A drop of water falling toward water in a glass

Names
- Preferred IUPAC name Water
- Systematic IUPAC name Oxidane (not in common use)
- Other names: Hydrogen oxide; Hydrogen hydroxide (H_{2}O or HOH); Hydroxylic acid; Dihydrogen monoxide (DHMO) (parody name); Dihydrogen oxide; Hydric acid; Hydrohydroxic acid; Hydroxic acid; Hydroxoic acid; Hydrol; μ-Oxidodihydrogen; κ^{1}-Hydroxylhydrogen(0); Aqua; Neutral liquid; Oxygen dihydride (may be considered incorrect)

Identifiers
CAS Number	7732-18-5
3D model (JSmol)	Interactive image
Beilstein Reference	3587155
ChEBI	CHEBI:15377
ChEMBL	ChEMBL1098659
ChemSpider	937
DrugBank	DB09145
EC Number	231-791-2
Gmelin Reference	117
KEGG	C00001
PubChem CID	962
RTECS number	ZC0110000
UNII	059QF0KO0R
- InChI: InChI=1S/H2O/h1H2 Key: XLYOFNOQVPJJNP-UHFFFAOYSA-N
- SMILES: O

Properties
Chemical formula	H_{2}O
Molar mass	18.015 g·mol^{−1}
Appearance	Almost colorless or white crystalline solid, almost colorless liquid, with a hint of blue, colorless gas
Odor	Odorless
Density	Liquid (1 atm, VSMOW): 0.99984283(84) g/mL at 0 °C; 0.99997495(84) g/mL at 3.983035(670) °C (temperature of maximum density, often 4 °C); 0.99704702(83) g/mL at 25 °C; 0.96188791(96) g/mL at 95 °C; Solid: 0.9167 g/mL at 0 °C
Melting point	0.00 °C (32.00 °F; 273.15 K) (Note: Vienna Standard Mean Ocean Water (VSMOW), used for calibration, melts at 273.150089(10) K (0.000089(10) °C, and boils at 373.1339 K (99.9839 °C). Other isotopic compositions melt or boil at slightly different temperatures.)
Boiling point	99.98 °C (211.96 °F; 373.13 K)
Solubility	Poorly soluble in haloalkanes, aliphatic and aromatic hydrocarbons, ethers. Improved solubility in carboxylates, alcohols, ketones, amines. Miscible with methanol, ethanol, propanol, isopropanol, acetone, glycerol, 1,4-dioxane, tetrahydrofuran, sulfolane, acetaldehyde, dimethylformamide, dimethoxyethane, dimethyl sulfoxide, acetonitrile. Partially miscible with diethyl ether, methyl ethyl ketone, dichloromethane, ethyl acetate, bromine.
Vapor pressure	3.1690 kilopascals or 0.031276 atm at 25 °C
Acidity (pK_{a})	13.995 (Note: A commonly quoted value of 15.7 used mainly in organic chemistry for the pK_{a} of water is incorrect.)
Basicity (pK_{b})	13.995
Conjugate acid	Hydronium H_{3}O^{+} (pK_{a} = 0)
Conjugate base	Hydroxide OH^{–} (pK_{b} = 0)
Thermal conductivity	0.6065 W/(m·K)
Refractive index (n_{D})	1.3330 (20 °C)
Viscosity	0.890 mPa·s (0.890 cP)

Structure
Crystal structure	Hexagonal
Point group	C_{2v}
Molecular shape	Bent
Dipole moment	1.8546 D

Thermochemistry
Heat capacity (C)	75.385 ± 0.05 J/(mol·K)
Std molar entropy (S^{⦵}_{298})	69.95 ± 0.03 J/(mol·K)
Std enthalpy of formation (Δ_{f}H^{⦵}_{298})	−285.83 ± 0.04 kJ/mol
Gibbs free energy (Δ_{f}G^{⦵})	−237.24 kJ/mol

Hazards
- Occupational safety and health (OHS/OSH)
Main hazards	Drowning; Avalanche (as snow); Water intoxication
NFPA 704 (fire diamond)	0 0 0
Flash point	Non-flammable

Related compounds
Other anions	Hydrogen sulfide; Hydrogen selenide; Hydrogen telluride; Hydrogen polonide; Hydrogen peroxide
Related solvents	Acetone; Ethanol; Methanol; Hydrogen fluoride; Ammonia

Supplementary data page
- Water (data page)
- Except where otherwise noted, data are given for materials in their standard state (at 25 °C [77 °F], 100 kPa). verify (what is ?) Infobox references

Water (H_{2}O) is a polar inorganic compound that is, at room temperature, a tasteless and odorless liquid, which is nearly colorless apart from an inherent hint of blue. It is by far the most studied chemical compound and is described as the "universal solvent" and the "solvent of life". It is the most abundant substance on the surface of Earth and the only common substance to exist as a solid, liquid, and gas on Earth's surface. It is also the third most abundant molecule in the universe (behind molecular hydrogen and carbon monoxide).

Water molecules form hydrogen bonds with each other and are strongly polar. This polarity allows them to dissociate ions in salts and bond to other polar substances such as alcohols and acids, thus dissolving them. Their hydrogen bonding causes their many unique properties, such as having a solid form less dense than its liquid form, a relatively high boiling point of 100 °C for its molar mass, and a high heat capacity.

Water is amphoteric, meaning that it can exhibit properties of an acid or a base, depending on the pH of the solution that it is in; It readily produces both H^{+} and OH^{−} ions. (Note: H^{+} represents H_{3}O^{+}(H_{2}O)_{n} and more complex ions that form.) Related to its amphoteric character, it undergoes self-ionization. The product of the activities, or approximately, the concentrations of H^{+} and OH^{−} is a constant, so their respective concentrations are inversely proportional to each other.

== Physical properties ==
Water is the chemical substance with chemical formula H_{2}O; one molecule of water has two hydrogen atoms covalently bonded to a single oxygen atom. Water is a tasteless, odorless liquid at ambient temperature and pressure. Liquid water has weak absorption bands at wavelengths of around 750 nm which cause it to appear to have a blue color. This can easily be observed in a water-filled bath or wash-basin whose lining is white. Large ice crystals, as in glaciers, also appear blue.

Under standard conditions, water is primarily a liquid, unlike other analogous hydrides of the oxygen family, which are generally gaseous. This unique property of water is due to hydrogen bonding. The molecules of water are constantly moving concerning each other, and hydrogen bonds continually break and reform at timescales faster than 200 femtoseconds (2 × 10^{−13} seconds). However, these bonds are strong enough to create many of the peculiar properties of water, some of which make it integral to life.

=== Water, ice, and vapor ===
Within the Earth's atmosphere and surface, the liquid phase is the most common and is the form that is generally denoted by the word "water". The solid phase of water is known as ice and commonly takes the structure of hard, amalgamated crystals, such as ice cubes, or loosely accumulated granular crystals, like snow. Aside from common hexagonal crystalline ice, other crystalline and amorphous phases of ice are known. The gaseous phase of water is known as water vapor (or steam). Visible steam and clouds are formed from minute droplets of water suspended in the air.

Water also forms a supercritical fluid. The critical point is at a temperature of 647 K and a pressure of 22.064 MPa. In nature, this only rarely occurs in extremely hostile conditions. A likely example of naturally occurring supercritical water is in the hottest parts of deep water hydrothermal vents, in which water is heated to the critical temperature by volcanic plumes and the critical pressure is caused by the weight of the ocean at the extreme depths where the vents are located. This pressure is reached at a depth of about 2200 meters: much less than the mean depth of the ocean (3800 meters).

==== Heat capacity and heats of vaporization and fusion ====
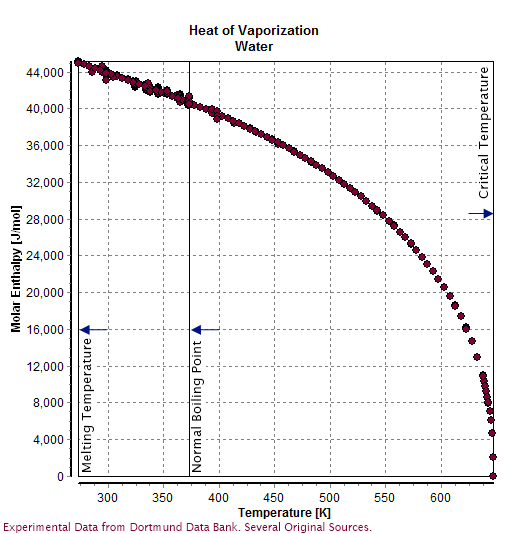
Heat of vaporization of water from melting to critical temperature

Water has a very high specific heat capacity of 4184 J/(kg·K) at 20 °C (4182 J/(kg·K) at 25 °C)—the second-highest among all the heteroatomic species (after ammonia), as well as a high heat of vaporization (40.65 kJ/mol or 2257 kJ/kg at the normal boiling point), both of which are a result of the extensive hydrogen bonding between its molecules. These unusual properties allow water to moderate Earth's climate by buffering large fluctuations in temperature. Most of the additional energy stored in the climate system since 1970 has accumulated in the oceans.

The specific enthalpy of fusion (more commonly known as latent heat) of water is 333.55 kJ/kg at 0 °C: the same amount of energy is required to melt ice as to warm ice from −160 °C up to its melting point or to heat the same amount of water by about 80 °C. Of common substances, only that of ammonia is higher. This property confers resistance to melting on the ice of glaciers and drift ice. Before and since the advent of mechanical refrigeration, ice was and still is in common use for retarding food spoilage.

The specific heat capacity of ice at −10 °C is 2030 J/(kg·K) and the heat capacity of steam at 100 °C is 2080 J/(kg·K).

==== Density of water and ice ====
Density of ice and water as a function of temperature

The density of water is about 1 gram per cubic centimetre (62 lb/cu ft): this relationship was originally used to define the gram. The density varies with temperature, but not linearly: as the temperature increases, the density rises to a peak at 3.98 °C (39.16 °F) and then decreases; the initial increase is unusual because most liquids undergo thermal expansion so that the density only decreases as a function of temperature. The increase observed for water from 0 °C (32 °F) to 3.98 °C (39.16 °F) and for a few other liquids (Note: Negative thermal expansion is also observed in molten silica. Also, fairly pure silicon has a negative coefficient of thermal expansion for temperatures between about 18 and 120 kelvins.) is described as negative thermal expansion. Regular, hexagonal ice is also less dense than liquid water—upon freezing, the density of water decreases by about 9%. (Note: Other substances that expand on freezing are silicon (melting point of 1,687 K (1,414 °C; 2,577 °F)), gallium (melting point of 303 K (30 °C; 86 °F), germanium (melting point of 1,211 K (938 °C; 1,720 °F)), and bismuth (melting point of 545 K (272 °C; 521 °F)))

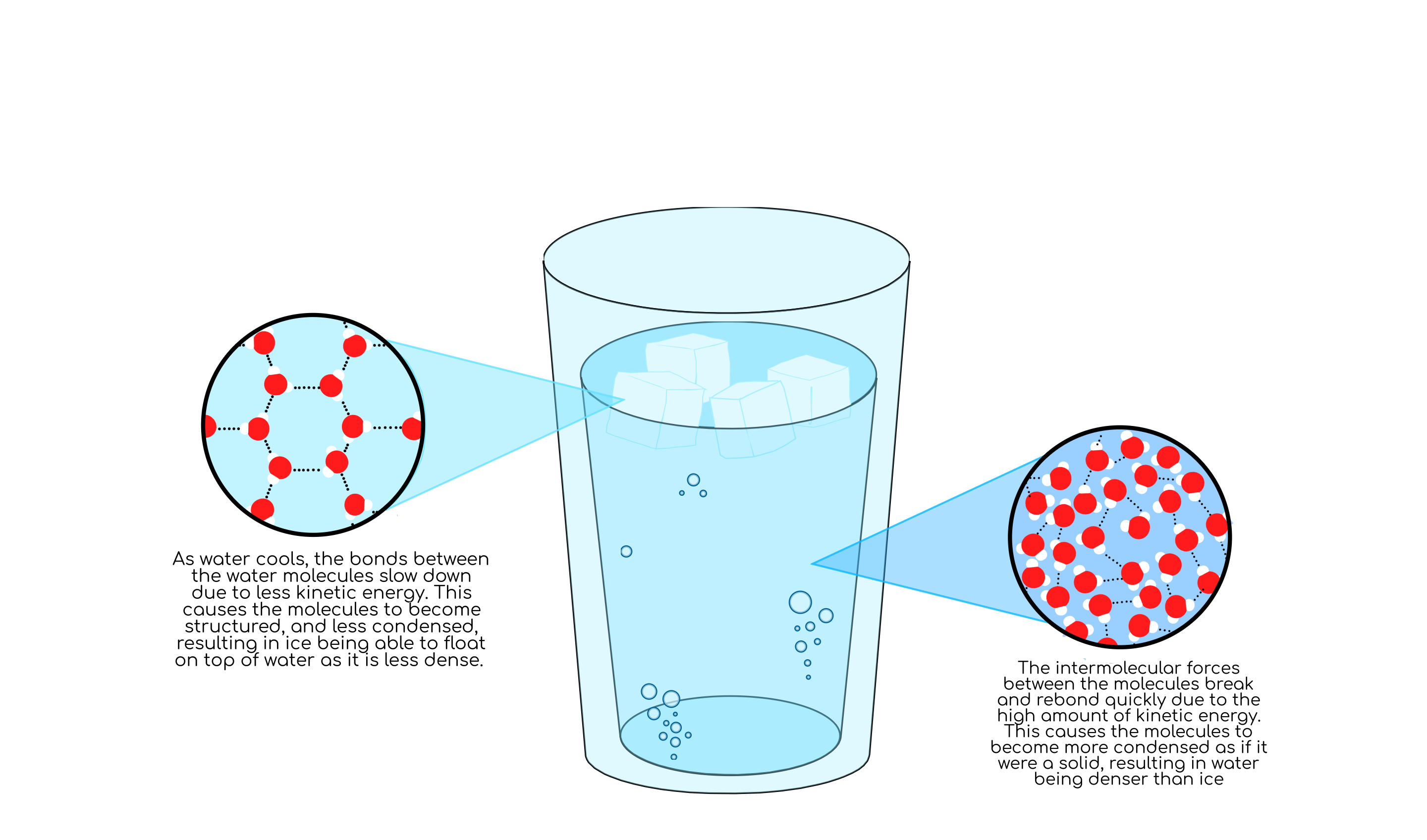
The difference in the molecular structures of water and ice

These peculiar effects are due to the highly directional bonding of water molecules via the hydrogen bonds: ice and liquid water at low temperature have comparatively low-density, low-energy open lattice structures. The breaking of hydrogen bonds on melting with increasing temperature in the range 0–4 °C allows for a denser molecular packing in which some of the lattice cavities are filled by water molecules. Above 4 °C, however, thermal expansion becomes the dominant effect, and water near the boiling point (100 °C) is about 4% less dense than water at 4 °C (39 °F). (Note: (1-0.95865/1.00000) × 100% = 4.135%)

Under increasing pressure, ice undergoes a number of transitions to other polymorphs with higher density than liquid water, such as ice II, ice III, high-density amorphous ice (HDA), and very-high-density amorphous ice (VHDA).

Temperature distribution in a lake in summer and winter

The unusual density curve and lower density of ice than of water is essential for much of the life on earth—if water were most dense at the freezing point, then in winter the cooling at the surface would lead to convective mixing. Once 0 °C is reached, the water body would freeze from the bottom up, and all life in it would be killed. Furthermore, given that water is a good thermal insulator (due to its heat capacity), some frozen lakes might not completely thaw in summer. As it is, the inversion of the density curve leads to a stable layering for surface temperatures below 4 °C, and with the layer of ice that floats on top insulating the water below, even e.g., Lake Baikal in central Siberia freezes only to about 1 m thickness in winter. In general, for deep enough lakes, the temperature at the bottom stays constant at about 4 °C (39 °F) throughout the year (see diagram).

==== Density of saltwater and ice ====
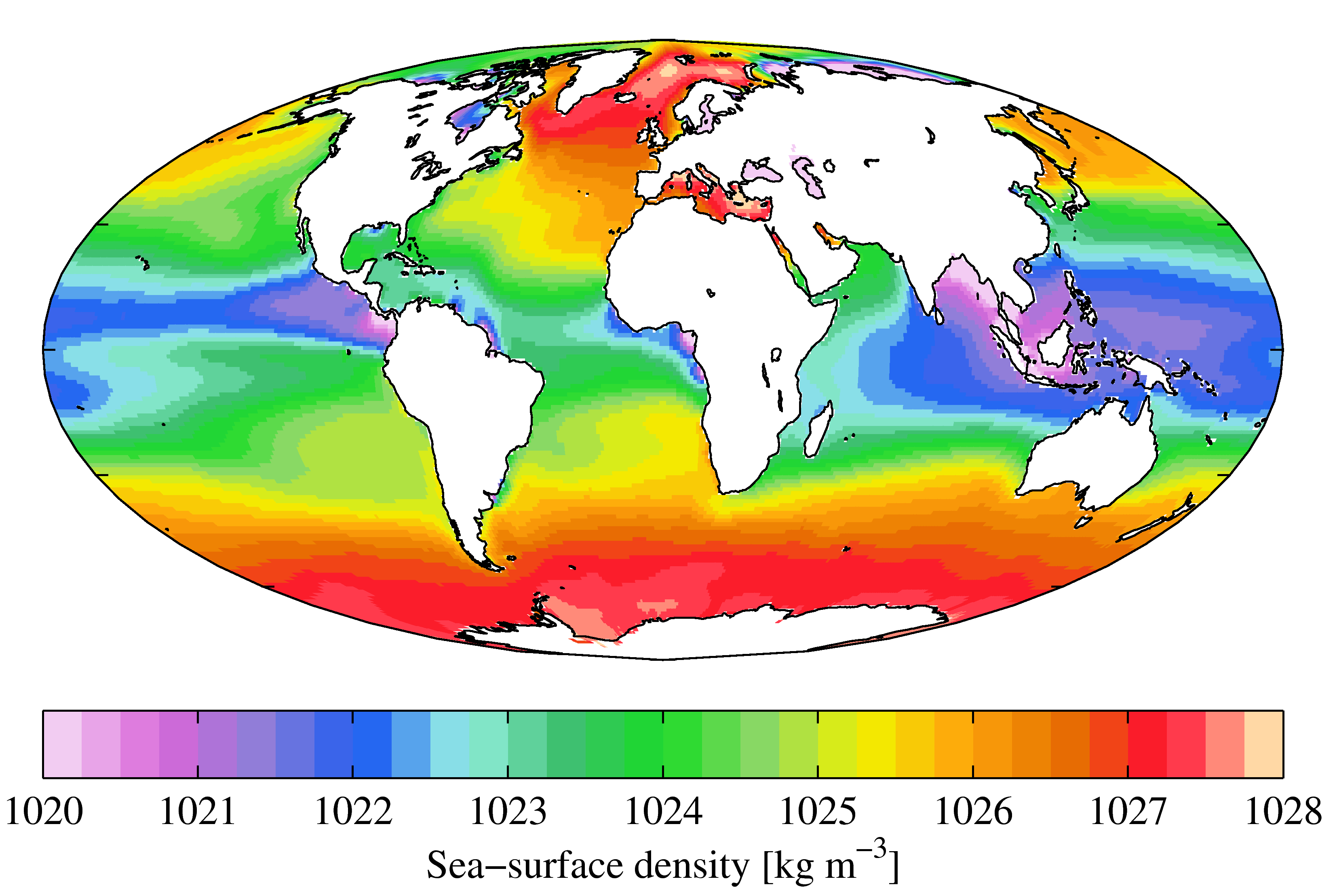
WOA surface density

The density of saltwater depends on the dissolved salt content as well as the temperature. Ice floats in the oceans; otherwise, they would freeze from the bottom up. However, the salt content of oceans lowers the freezing point by about 1.9 °C (due to freezing-point depression of a solvent containing a solute) and lowers the temperature of the density maximum of water to the former freezing point at 0 °C. This is why, in ocean water, the downward convection of colder water is not blocked by an expansion of water as it becomes colder near the freezing point. The oceans' cold water near the freezing point continues to sink. So creatures that live at the bottom of cold oceans like the Arctic Ocean generally live in water 4 °C colder than at the bottom of frozen-over fresh water lakes and rivers.

As the surface of saltwater begins to freeze (at −1.9 °C for normal salinity seawater, 3.5%) the ice that forms is essentially salt-free, with about the same density as freshwater ice. This ice floats on the surface, and the salt that is "frozen out" adds to the salinity and density of the seawater just below it, in a process known as brine rejection. This denser saltwater sinks by convection and the replacing seawater is subject to the same process. This produces essentially freshwater ice at −1.9 °C on the surface. The increased density of the seawater beneath the forming ice causes it to sink toward the bottom. On a large scale, the process of brine rejection and sinking cold salty water results in ocean currents forming to transport such water away from the Poles, leading to a global system of currents called the thermohaline circulation.

==== Miscibility and condensation ====
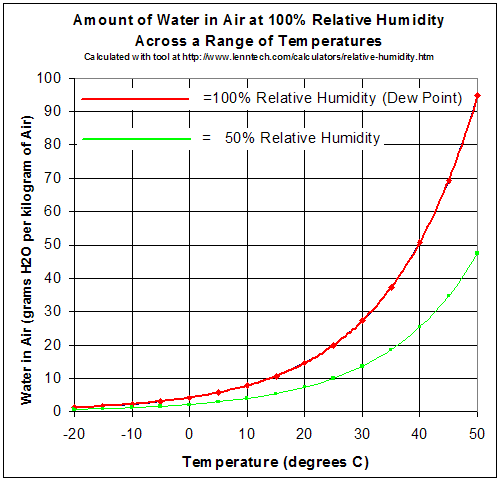
Red line shows saturation

Water is miscible with many liquids, including ethanol in all proportions. Water and most oils are immiscible, usually forming layers according to increasing density from the top. This can be predicted by comparing the polarity. Water being a relatively polar compound will tend to be miscible with liquids of high polarity such as ethanol and acetone, whereas compounds with low polarity will tend to be immiscible and poorly soluble such as with hydrocarbons.

As a gas, water vapor is completely miscible with air. On the other hand, the maximum water vapor pressure that is thermodynamically stable with the liquid (or solid) at a given temperature is relatively low compared with total atmospheric pressure. For example, if the vapor's partial pressure is 2% of atmospheric pressure and the air is cooled from 25 °C, starting at about 22 °C, water will start to condense, defining the dew point, and creating fog or dew. The reverse process accounts for the fog burning off in the morning. If the humidity is increased at room temperature, for example, by running a hot shower or a bath, and the temperature stays about the same, the vapor soon reaches the pressure for phase change and then condenses out as minute water droplets, commonly referred to as steam.

A saturated gas or one with 100% relative humidity is when the vapor pressure of water in the air is at equilibrium with vapor pressure due to (liquid) water; water (or ice, if cool enough) will fail to lose mass through evaporation when exposed to saturated air. Because the amount of water vapor in the air is small, relative humidity, the ratio of the partial pressure due to the water vapor to the saturated partial vapor pressure, is much more useful. Vapor pressure above 100% relative humidity is called supersaturated and can occur if the air is rapidly cooled, for example, by rising suddenly in an updraft. (Note: Adiabatic cooling resulting from the ideal gas law.)

==== Vapour pressure ====
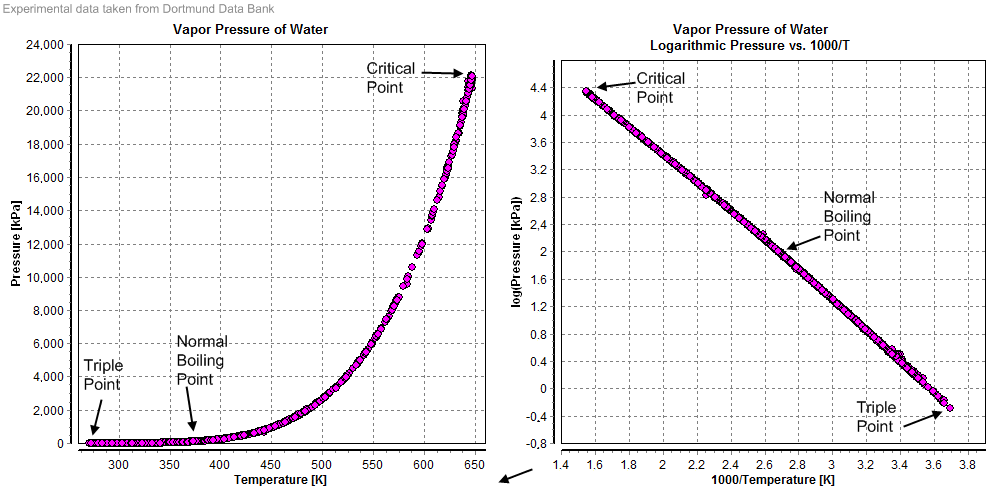
Vapor pressure diagrams of water

==== Compressibility ====
The compressibility of water is a function of pressure and temperature. At 0 °C, at the limit of zero pressure, the compressibility is 5.1×10^{−10} Pa^{−1}. At the zero-pressure limit, the compressibility reaches a minimum of 4.4×10^{−10} Pa^{−1} around 45 °C before increasing again with increasing temperature. As the pressure is increased, the compressibility decreases, being 3.9×10^{−10} Pa^{−1} at 0 °C and 100 megapascals (1,000 bar).

The bulk modulus of water is about 2.2 GPa. The low compressibility of non-gasses, and of water in particular, leads to their often being assumed as incompressible. The low compressibility of water means that even in the deep oceans at 4 kilometres (2.5 mi) depth, where pressures are 40 MPa, there is only a 1.8% decrease in volume.

The bulk modulus of water ice ranges from 11.3 GPa at 0 K up to 8.6 GPa at 273 K. The large change in the compressibility of ice as a function of temperature is the result of its relatively large thermal expansion coefficient compared to other common solids.

==== Triple point ====
The solid/liquid/vapor triple point of liquid water, ice I_{h}, and water vapor in the lower left portion of a water phase diagram.

The temperature and pressure at which ordinary solid, liquid, and gaseous water coexist in equilibrium is the gas–liquid–solid triple point of water. Since 1954, this point had been used to define the base unit of temperature, the kelvin, but, starting in 2019, the kelvin is now defined using the Boltzmann constant, rather than the triple point of water.

Due to the existence of many polymorphs (forms) of ice, water has other triple points, which have either three polymorphs of ice or two polymorphs of ice and liquid in equilibrium. Gustav Tammann in Göttingen produced data on several other triple points in the early 20th century. Kamb and others documented further triple points in the 1960s.

The various triple points of water
Phases in stable equilibrium	Pressure	Temperature
liquid water, ice I_{h}, and water vapor	611.657 Pa	273.16 K (0.01 °C)
liquid water, ice I_{h}, and ice III	209.9 MPa	251 K (−22 °C)
liquid water, ice III, and ice V	350.1 MPa	−17.0 °C
liquid water, ice V, and ice VI	632.4 MPa	0.16 °C
ice I_{h}, ice II, and ice III	213 MPa	−35 °C
ice II, ice III, and ice V	344 MPa	−24 °C
ice II, ice V, and ice VI	626 MPa	−70 °C

==== Melting point ====
The melting point of ice is 0 °C (32 °F; 273 K) at standard pressure; however, pure liquid water can be supercooled well below that temperature without freezing if the liquid is not mechanically disturbed. It can remain in a fluid state down to its homogeneous nucleation point of about 231 K (−42 °C; −44 °F). The melting point of ordinary hexagonal ice falls slightly under moderately high pressures, by 0.0073 °C (0.0131 °F)/atm (Note: The source gives it as 0.0072°C/atm. However the author defines an atmosphere as 1,000,000 dynes/cm^{2} (a bar). Using the standard definition of atmosphere, 1,013,250 dynes/cm^{2}, it works out to 0.0073°C/atm.) or about 0.5 °C (0.90 °F)/70 atm (Note: Using the fact that 0.5/0.0073 = 68.5.) as the stabilization energy of hydrogen bonding is exceeded by intermolecular repulsion, but as ice transforms into its polymorphs (see crystalline states of ice) above 209.9 MPa (2,072 atm), the melting point increases markedly with pressure, i.e., reaching 355 K (82 °C) at 2.216 GPa (21,870 atm) (triple point of ice VII).

=== Electrical properties ===
==== Electrical conductivity ====
Pure water containing no exogenous ions is an excellent electrical insulator, but not even "deionized" water is completely free of ions. Water undergoes autoionization in the liquid state when two water molecules form one hydroxide anion (OH^{−}) and one hydronium cation (H_{3}O^{+}). Because of autoionization, at ambient temperatures pure liquid water has a similar intrinsic charge carrier concentration to the semiconductor germanium and an intrinsic charge carrier concentration three orders of magnitude greater than the semiconductor silicon, hence, based on charge carrier concentration, water cannot be considered to be a completely dielectric material or electrical insulator but to be a limited conductor of ionic charge.

Because water is such a good solvent, it almost always has some solute dissolved in it, often a salt. If water has even a tiny amount of such an impurity, then the ions can carry charges back and forth, allowing the water to conduct electricity far more readily.

It is known that the theoretical maximum electrical resistivity for water is approximately 18.2 MΩ·cm (182 kΩ·m) at 25 °C. This figure agrees well with what is typically seen on reverse osmosis, ultra-filtered, and deionized ultra-pure water used, for example, in semiconductor manufacturing plants. A salt or acid contaminant level exceeding even 100 parts per trillion (ppt) in otherwise ultra-pure water begins to noticeably lower its resistivity by up to several kΩ·m.

In pure water, sensitive equipment can detect a very slight electrical conductivity of 0.05501 ± 0.0001 μS/cm at 25.00 °C. Water can also be electrolyzed into oxygen and hydrogen gases but in the absence of dissolved ions this is a very slow process, as very little current is conducted. In ice, the primary charge carriers are protons (see Proton conductor). Ice was previously thought to have a small but measurable conductivity of 1×10^{−10} S/cm, but this conductivity is now thought to be almost entirely from surface defects, and without those, ice is an insulator with an immeasurably small conductivity.

=== Polarity and hydrogen bonding ===
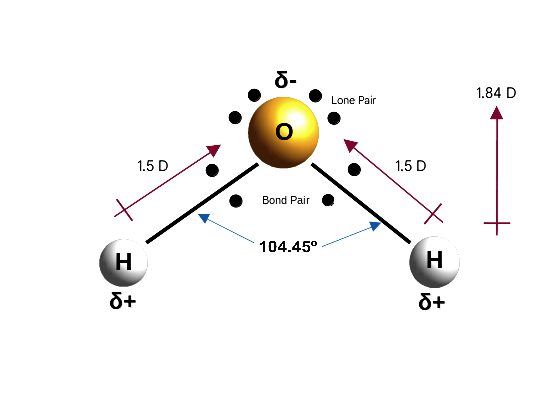
Water molecule - structure and dipole moment

An important feature of water is its polar nature. The structure has a bent molecular geometry for the two hydrogens from the oxygen vertex. The oxygen atom also has two lone pairs of electrons. One effect usually ascribed to the lone pairs is that the H–O–H gas-phase bend angle is 104.48°, which is smaller than the typical tetrahedral angle of 109.47°. The lone pairs are closer to the oxygen atom than the electrons sigma bonded to the hydrogens, so they require more space. The increased repulsion of the lone pairs forces the O–H bonds closer to each other.

Another consequence of its structure is that water is a polar molecule. Due to the difference in electronegativity, a bond dipole moment points from each H to the O, making the oxygen partially negative and each hydrogen partially positive. A large molecular dipole, points from a region between the two hydrogen atoms to the oxygen atom. The charge differences cause water molecules to aggregate (the relatively positive areas being attracted to the relatively negative areas). This attraction, hydrogen bonding, explains many of the properties of water, such as its solvent properties.

Although hydrogen bonding is a relatively weak attraction compared to the covalent bonds within the water molecule itself, it is responsible for several of the water's physical properties. These properties include its relatively high melting and boiling point temperatures: more energy is required to break the hydrogen bonds between water molecules. In contrast, hydrogen sulfide (H_{2}S), has much weaker hydrogen bonding due to sulfur's lower electronegativity. H_{2}S is a gas at room temperature, despite hydrogen sulfide having nearly twice the molar mass of water. The extra bonding between water molecules also gives liquid water a large specific heat capacity. This high heat capacity makes water a good heat storage medium (coolant) and heat shield.

==== Cohesion and adhesion ====
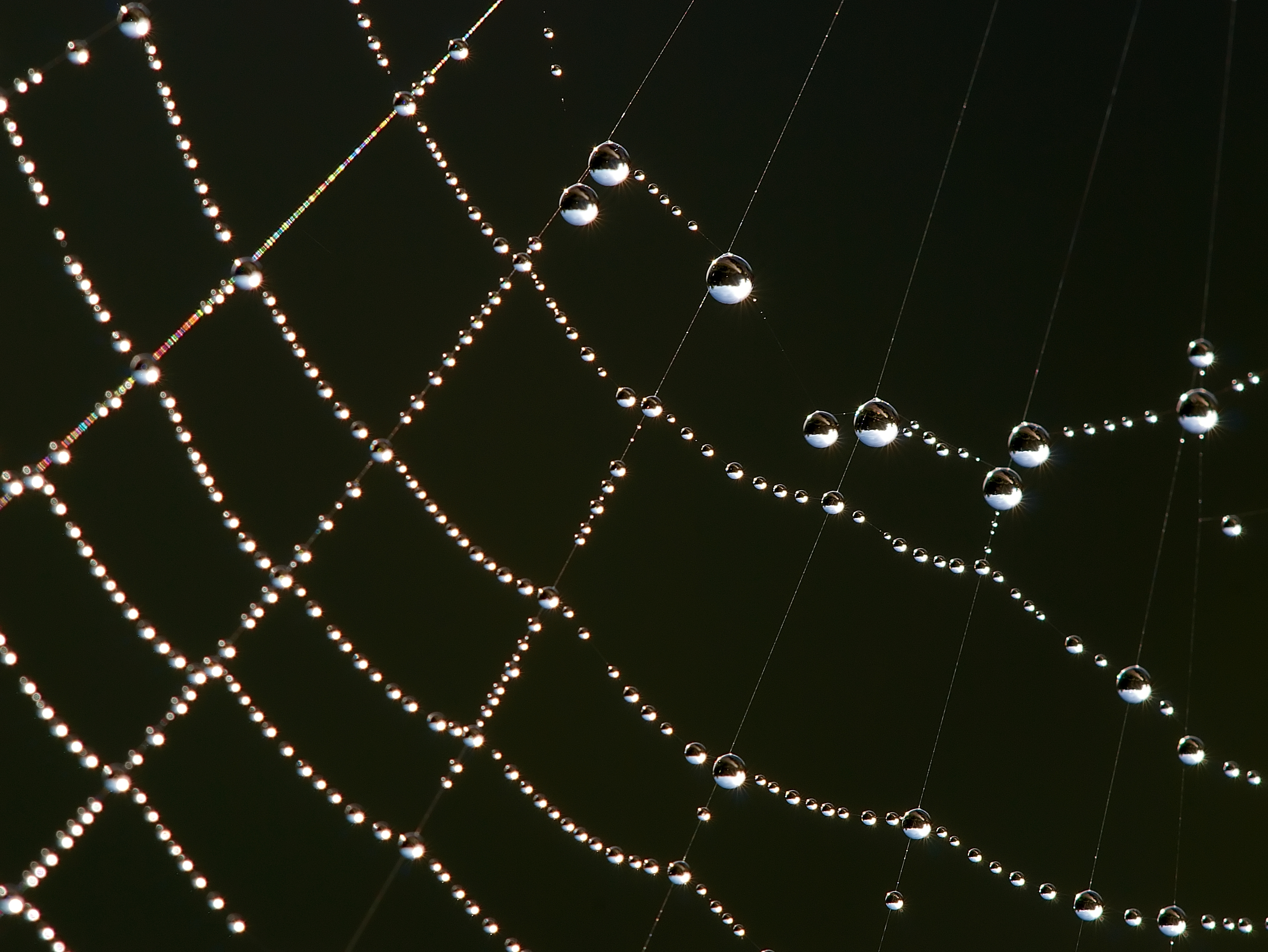
Dew drops adhering to a spider web

Water molecules stay close to each other (cohesion), due to the collective action of hydrogen bonds between water molecules. These hydrogen bonds are constantly breaking, with new bonds being formed with different water molecules; but at any given time in a sample of liquid water, a large portion of the molecules are held together by such bonds.

Water also has high adhesion properties because of its polar nature. On clean, smooth glass the water may form a thin film because the molecular forces between glass and water molecules (adhesive forces) are stronger than the cohesive forces. In biological cells and organelles, water is in contact with membrane and protein surfaces that are hydrophilic; that is, surfaces that have a strong attraction to water. Irving Langmuir observed a strong repulsive force between hydrophilic surfaces. To dehydrate hydrophilic surfaces—to remove the strongly held layers of water of hydration—requires doing substantial work against these forces, called hydration forces. These forces are very large but decrease rapidly over a nanometer or less. They are important in biology, particularly when cells are dehydrated by exposure to dry atmospheres or to extracellular freezing.

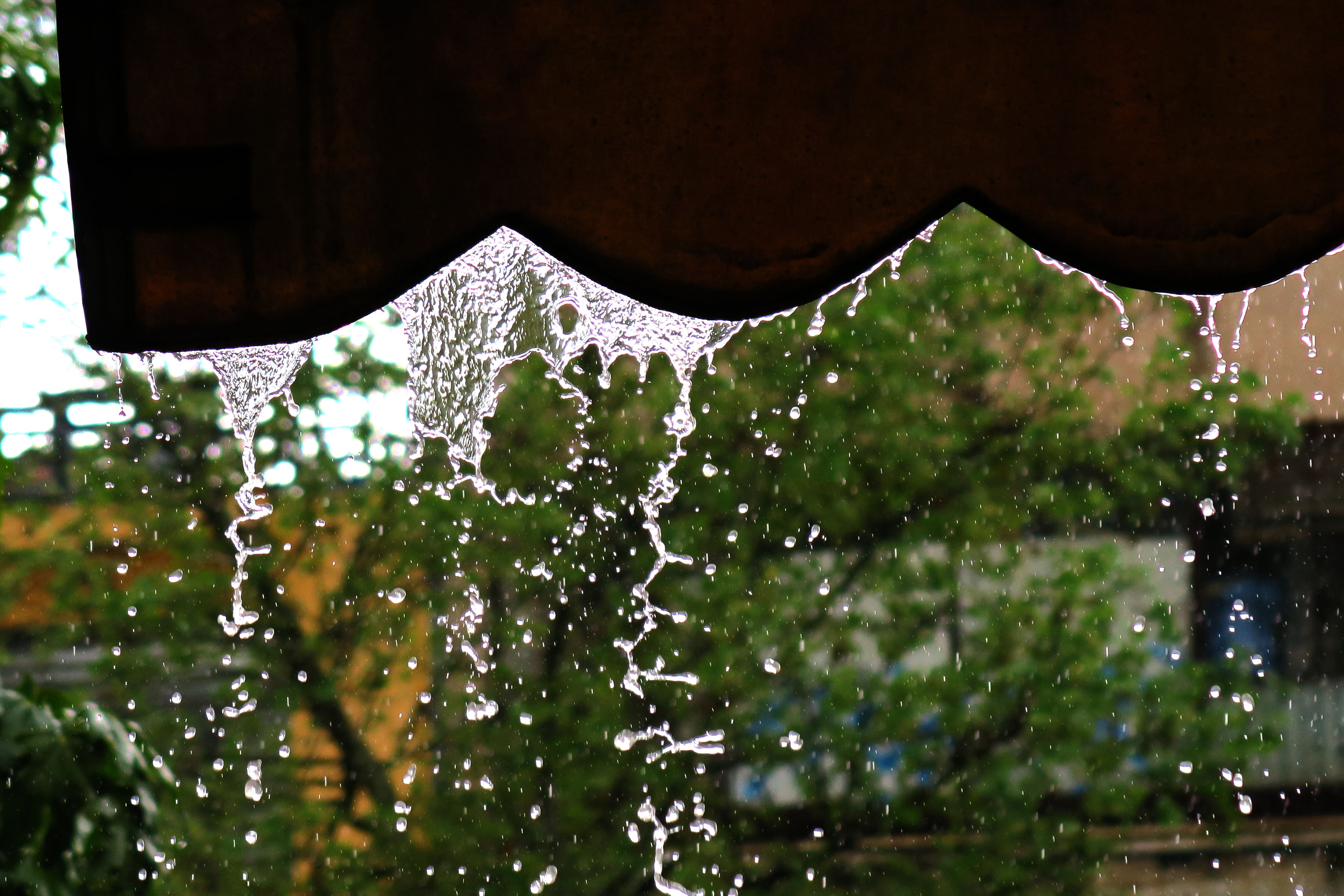
Rain water flux from a canopy. Among the forces that govern drop formation: surface tension, cohesion, van der Waals force, Plateau–Rayleigh instability.

==== Surface tension ====
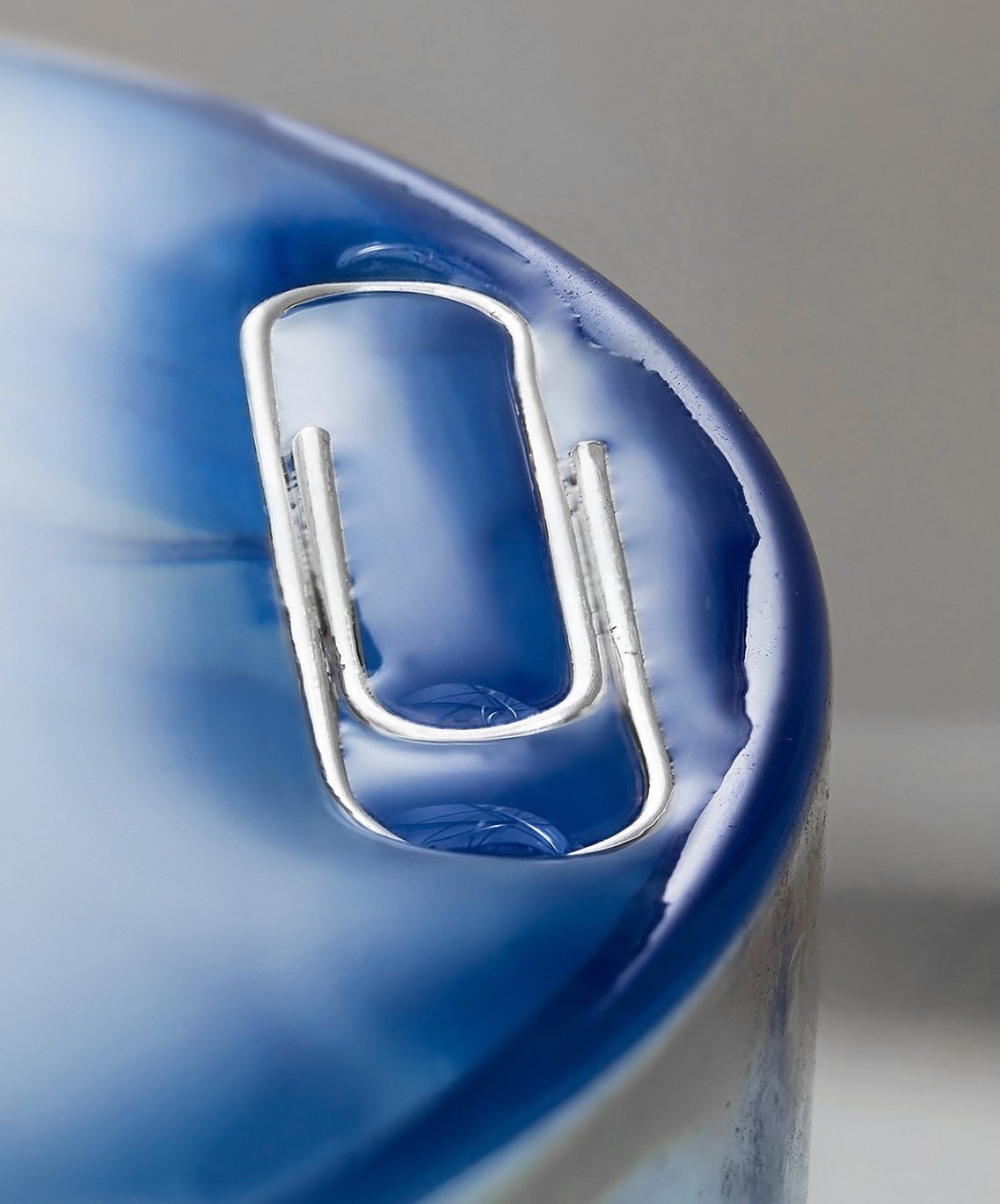
This paper clip is under the water level, which has risen gently and smoothly. Surface tension prevents the clip from submerging and the water from overflowing the glass edges.

Water has an unusually high surface tension of 71.99 mN/m at 25 °C which is caused by the strength of the hydrogen bonding between water molecules. This allows insects to walk on water.

==== Capillary action ====
Because water has strong cohesive and adhesive forces, it exhibits capillary action. Strong cohesion from hydrogen bonding and adhesion allows trees to transport water more than 100 m upward.

Temperature dependence of the surface tension of pure water

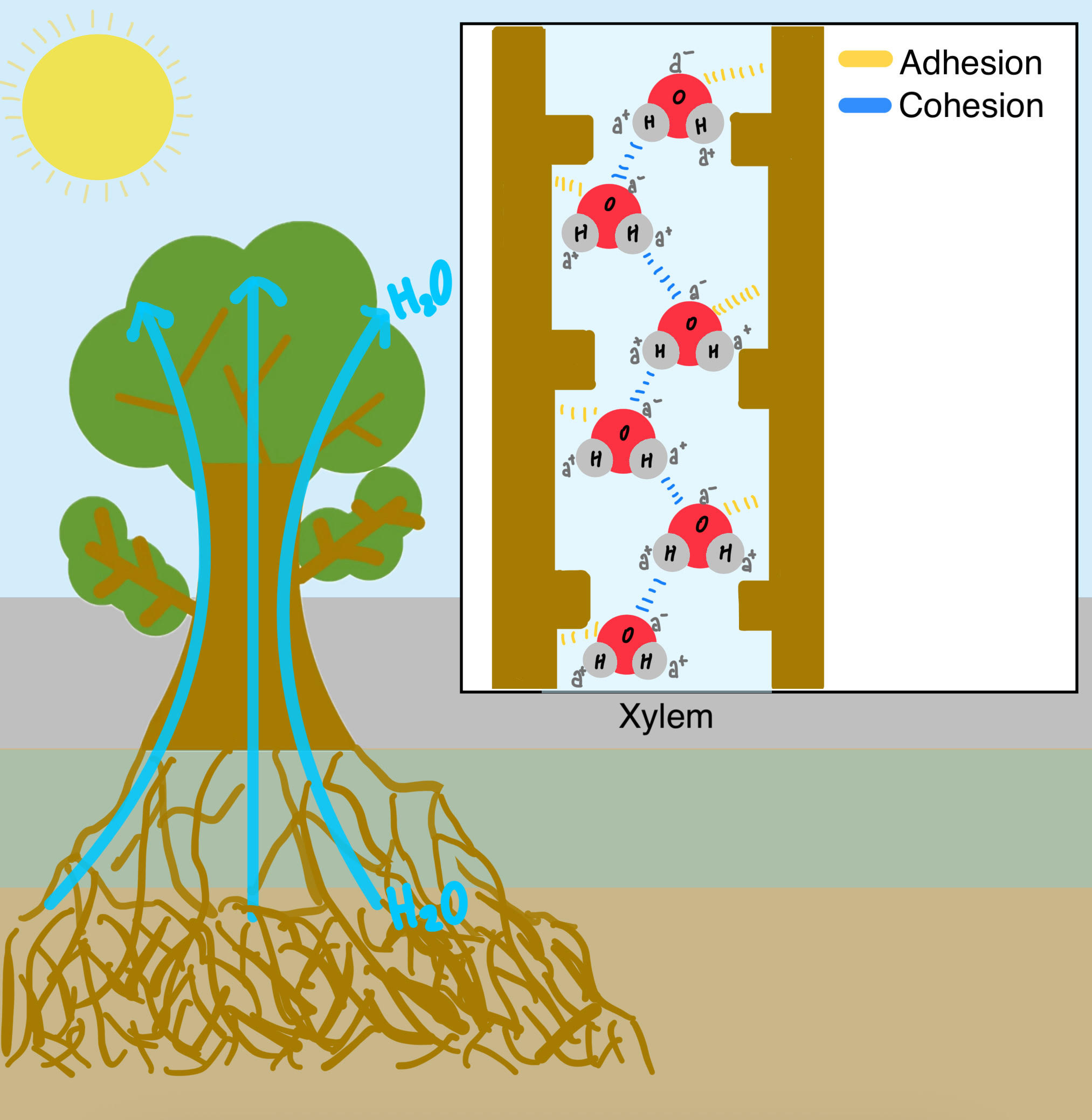
A diagram illustrating capillary action in plants, showing the roles of cohesion and adhesion in the upward movement of water through the xylem.

==== Water as a solvent ====
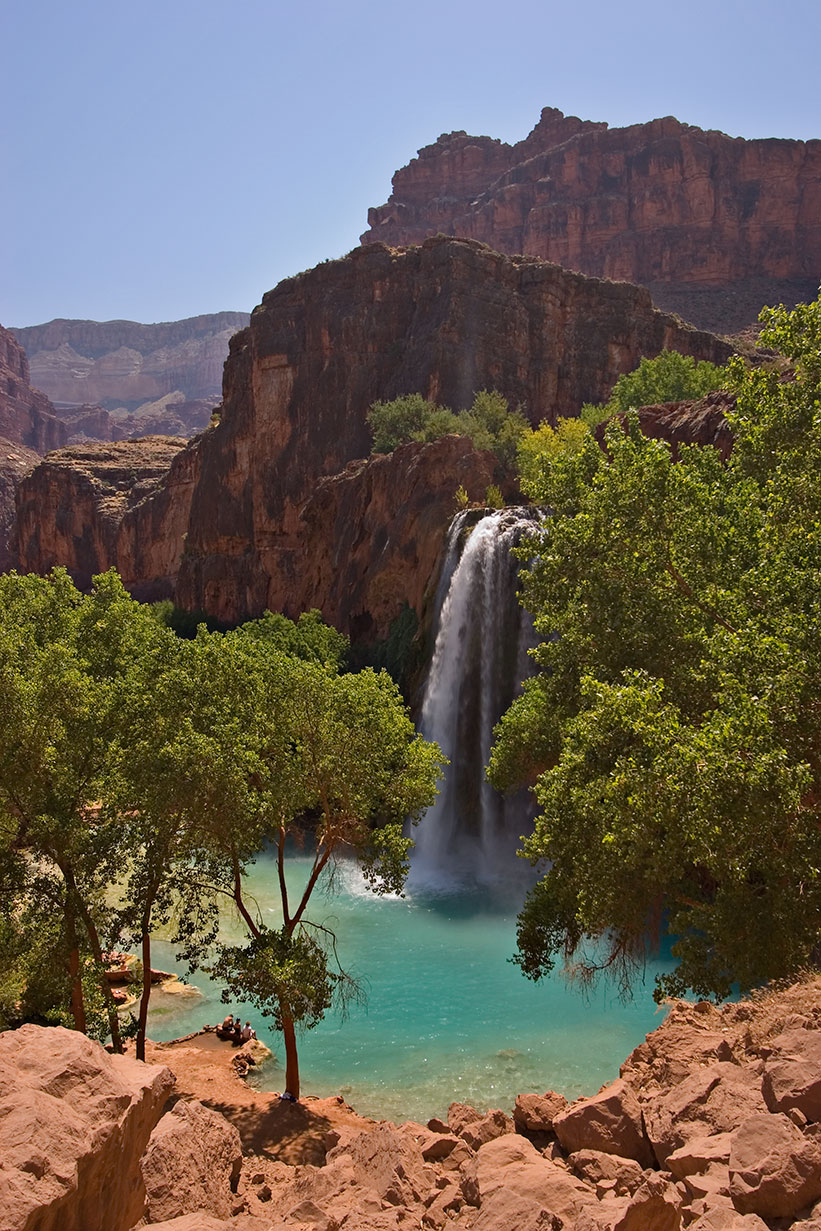
Presence of colloidal calcium carbonate from high concentrations of dissolved lime turns the water of Havasu Falls turquoise.

Water is an excellent solvent due to its high dielectric constant. Substances that mix well and dissolve in water are known as hydrophilic ("water-loving") substances, while those that do not mix well with water are known as hydrophobic ("water-fearing") substances. The ability of a substance to dissolve in water is determined by whether or not the substance can match or better the strong attractive forces that water molecules generate between other water molecules. If a substance has properties that do not allow it to overcome these strong intermolecular forces, the molecules are precipitated out from the water. Contrary to the common misconception, water and hydrophobic substances do not "repel", and the hydration of a hydrophobic surface is energetically, but not entropically, favorable.

When an ionic or polar compound enters water, it is surrounded by water molecules (hydration). The relatively small size of water molecules (~3 angstroms) allows many water molecules to surround one molecule of solute. The partially negative dipole ends of the water are attracted to positively charged components of the solute, and vice versa for the positive dipole ends.

In general, ionic and polar substances such as acids, alcohols, and salts are relatively soluble in water, and nonpolar substances such as fats and oils are not. Nonpolar molecules stay together in water because it is energetically more favorable for the water molecules to hydrogen bond to each other than to engage in van der Waals interactions with non-polar molecules.

An example of an ionic solute is table salt; the sodium chloride, NaCl, separates into Na^{+} cations and Cl^{−} anions, each being surrounded by water molecules. The ions are then easily transported away from their crystalline lattice into solution. An example of a nonionic solute is table sugar. The water dipoles make hydrogen bonds with the polar regions of the sugar molecule (OH groups) and allow it to be carried away into solution.

==== Quantum tunneling ====
The quantum tunneling dynamics in water was reported as early as 1992. At that time it was known that there are motions which destroy and regenerate the weak hydrogen bond by internal rotations of the substituent water monomers. On 18 March 2016, it was reported that the hydrogen bond can be broken by quantum tunneling in the water hexamer. Unlike previously reported tunneling motions in water, this involved the concerted breaking of two hydrogen bonds. Later in the same year, the discovery of the quantum tunneling of water molecules was reported.

=== Electromagnetic absorption ===
Water is relatively transparent to visible light, near ultraviolet light, and far-red light, but it absorbs most ultraviolet light, infrared light, and microwaves. Most photoreceptors and photosynthetic pigments utilize the portion of the light spectrum that is transmitted well through water. Microwave ovens take advantage of water's opacity to microwave radiation to heat the water inside of foods. Water's light blue color is caused by weak absorption in the red part of the visible spectrum.

== Structure ==
Model of hydrogen bonds (1) between molecules of water

A single water molecule can participate in a maximum of four hydrogen bonds because it can accept two bonds using the lone pairs on oxygen and donate two hydrogen atoms. Other molecules like hydrogen fluoride, ammonia, and methanol can also form hydrogen bonds. However, they do not show anomalous thermodynamic, kinetic, or structural properties like those observed in water because none of them can form four hydrogen bonds: either they cannot donate or accept hydrogen atoms, or there are steric effects in bulky residues. In water, intermolecular tetrahedral structures form due to the four hydrogen bonds, thereby forming an open structure and a three-dimensional bonding network, resulting in the anomalous decrease in density when cooled below 4 °C. This repeated, constantly reorganising unit defines a three-dimensional network extending throughout the liquid. This view is based upon neutron scattering studies and computer simulations, and it makes sense in the light of the unambiguously tetrahedral arrangement of water molecules in ice structures.

However, there is an alternative theory for the structure of water. In 2004, a controversial paper from Stockholm University suggested that water molecules in the liquid state typically bind not to four but only two others; thus forming chains and rings. The term "string theory of water" (which is not to be confused with the string theory of physics) was coined. These observations were based upon X-ray absorption spectroscopy that probed the local environment of individual oxygen atoms.

=== Molecular structure ===
The repulsive effects of the two lone pairs on the oxygen atom cause water to have a bent, not linear, molecular structure, allowing it to be polar. The hydrogen–oxygen–hydrogen angle is 104.45°, which is less than the 109.47° for ideal sp^{3} hybridization. The valence bond theory explanation is that the oxygen atom's lone pairs are physically larger and therefore take up more space than the oxygen atom's bonds to the hydrogen atoms. The molecular orbital theory explanation (Bent's rule) is that lowering the energy of the oxygen atom's nonbonding hybrid orbitals (by assigning them more s character and less p character) and correspondingly raising the energy of the oxygen atom's hybrid orbitals bonded to the hydrogen atoms (by assigning them more p character and less s character) has the net effect of lowering the energy of the occupied molecular orbitals because the energy of the oxygen atom's nonbonding hybrid orbitals contributes completely to the energy of the oxygen atom's lone pairs while the energy of the oxygen atom's other two hybrid orbitals contributes only partially to the energy of the bonding orbitals (the remainder of the contribution coming from the hydrogen atoms' 1s orbitals).

== Chemical properties ==
=== Self-ionization ===
In liquid water there is some self-ionization giving hydronium ions and hydroxide ions.

2 H_{2}O ⇌ H_{3}O^{+} + OH^{−}

The equilibrium constant for this reaction, known as the ionic product of water, $K_{\rm w}=[{\rm{H_3O^+}}][{\rm{OH^-}}]$, has a value of about 10^{−14} at 25 °C. At neutral pH, the concentration of the hydroxide ion (OH^{−}) equals that of the (solvated) hydrogen ion (H^{+}), with a value close to 10^{−7} mol L^{−1} at 25 °C. See data page for values at other temperatures.

The thermodynamic equilibrium constant is a quotient of thermodynamic activities of all products and reactants including water:

$$K_{\rm eq}=\frac{a_{\rm{H_3O^+}} \cdot a_{\rm{OH^-}}}{a_{\rm{H_2O}}^2}$$

However, for dilute solutions, the activity of a solute such as H_{3}O^{+} or OH^{−} is approximated by its concentration, and the activity of the solvent H_{2}O is approximated by 1, so that we obtain the simple ionic product $K_{\rm eq} \approx K_{\rm w}=[{\rm{H_3O^+}}][{\rm{OH^-}}]$

=== Geochemistry ===
The action of water on rock over long periods of time typically leads to weathering and water erosion, physical processes that convert solid rocks and minerals into soil and sediment, but under some conditions chemical reactions with water occur as well, resulting in metasomatism or mineral hydration, a type of chemical alteration of a rock which produces clay minerals. It also occurs when Portland cement hardens.

Water ice can form clathrate compounds, known as clathrate hydrates, with a variety of small molecules that can be embedded in its spacious crystal lattice. The most notable of these is methane clathrate, 4 CH_{4}·23H_{2}O, naturally found in large quantities on the ocean floor.

=== Acidity in nature ===
Rain is generally mildly acidic, with a pH between 5.2 and 5.8 if not having any acid stronger than carbon dioxide. If high amounts of nitrogen and sulfur oxides are present in the air, they too will dissolve into the cloud and raindrops, producing acid rain.

== Isotopologues ==
Several isotopes of both hydrogen and oxygen exist, giving rise to several known isotopologues of water. Vienna Standard Mean Ocean Water is the current international standard for water isotopes. Naturally occurring water is almost completely composed of the neutron-less hydrogen isotope protium. Only 155 ppm include deuterium (^{2}H or D), a hydrogen isotope with one neutron, and fewer than 20 parts per quintillion include tritium (^{3}H or T), which has two neutrons. Oxygen also has three stable isotopes, with ^{16}O present in 99.76%, ^{17}O in 0.04%, and ^{18}O in 0.2% of water molecules.

Deuterium oxide, D_{2}O, is also known as heavy water because of its higher density. It is used in some nuclear reactors as a neutron moderator. Tritium is radioactive, decaying with a half-life of 4500 days; THO exists in nature only in minute quantities, being produced primarily via cosmic ray-induced nuclear reactions in the atmosphere. Water with one protium and one deuterium atom HDO occur naturally in ordinary water in low concentrations (~0.03%) and D_{2}O in far lower amounts (0.000003%) and any such molecules are temporary as the atoms recombine.

The most notable physical differences between H_{2}O and D_{2}O, other than the simple difference in specific mass, involve properties that are affected by hydrogen bonding, such as freezing and boiling, and other kinetic effects. This is because the nucleus of deuterium is twice as heavy as protium, and this causes noticeable differences in bonding energies. The difference in boiling points allows the isotopologues to be separated. The self-diffusion coefficient of H_{2}O at 25 °C is 23% higher than the value of D_{2}O. Because water molecules exchange hydrogen atoms with one another, hydrogen deuterium oxide (DOH) is much more common in low-purity heavy water than pure dideuterium monoxide D_{2}O.

Consumption of pure isolated D_{2}O may affect biochemical processes—ingestion of large amounts impairs kidney and central nervous system function. Small quantities can be consumed without any ill-effects; humans are generally unaware of taste differences, but sometimes report a burning sensation or sweet flavor. Very large amounts of heavy water must be consumed for any toxicity to become apparent. Rats, however, avoid heavy water by smell, and it is toxic to many animals.

Light water refers to deuterium-depleted water (DDW), water in which the deuterium content has been reduced below the standard 155 ppm level.

== Occurrence ==
Water is the most abundant substance on Earth's surface and also the third most abundant molecule in the universe, after H_{2} and CO. 0.23 ppm of the earth's mass is water and 97.39% of the global water volume of 1.38×10^{9} km^{3} is found in the oceans.

Water is far more prevalent in the outer Solar System, beyond a point called the frost line, where the Sun's radiation is too weak to vaporize solid and liquid water (as well as other elements and chemical compounds with relatively low melting points, such as methane and ammonia). In the inner Solar System, planets, asteroids, and moons formed almost entirely of metals and silicates. Water has since been delivered to the inner Solar System via an as-yet unknown mechanism, theorized to be the impacts of asteroids or comets carrying water from the outer Solar System, where bodies contain much more water ice. The difference between planetary bodies located inside and outside the frost line can be stark. Earth's mass is 0.000023% water, while Tethys, a moon of Saturn, is almost entirely made of water.

== Reactions ==
=== Acid–base reactions ===
Water is amphoteric: it has the ability to act as either an acid or a base in chemical reactions. According to the Brønsted–Lowry definition, an acid is a proton (H^{+}) donor and a base is a proton acceptor. When reacting with a stronger acid, water acts as a base; when reacting with a stronger base, it acts as an acid. For instance, water receives an H^{+} ion from HCl when hydrochloric acid is formed:

+ ⇌ H_{3}O^{+} + Cl^{−}

In the reaction with ammonia, NH_{3}, water donates a H^{+} ion, and is thus acting as an acid:

+ ⇌ NH^{+}_{4} + OH^{−}

Because the oxygen atom in water has two lone pairs, water often acts as a Lewis base, or electron-pair donor, in reactions with Lewis acids, although it can also react with Lewis bases, forming hydrogen bonds between the electron pair donors and the hydrogen atoms of water. HSAB theory describes water as both a weak hard acid and a weak hard base, meaning that it reacts preferentially with other hard species:

+ → H_{3}O^{+}
+ → Fe(H_{2}O)^{3+}_{6}
+ → Cl(H_{2}O)^{−}_{6}

When a salt of a weak acid or of a weak base is dissolved in water, water can partially hydrolyze the salt, producing the corresponding base or acid, which gives aqueous solutions of soap and baking soda their basic pH:

Na_{2}CO_{3} + H_{2}O ⇌ NaOH + NaHCO_{3}

=== Ligand chemistry ===
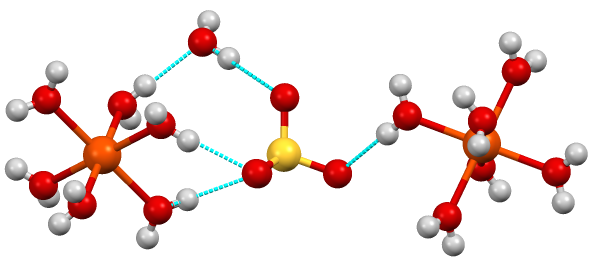
Some hydrogen-bonding contacts in FeSO_{4}^{.}7H_{2}O. This metal aquo complex crystallizes with one molecule of "lattice" water, which interacts with the sulfate and with the [Fe(H_{2}O)_{6}]^{2+} centers.

Water's Lewis base character makes it a common ligand in transition metal complexes, examples of which include metal aquo complexes such as Fe(H_{2}O)^{2+}_{6} to perrhenic acid, which contains two water molecules coordinated to a rhenium center. In solid hydrates, water can be either a ligand or simply lodged in the framework, or both. Thus, FeSO_{4}·7H_{2}O consists of [Fe(H_{2}O)_{6}]^{2+} centers and one "lattice water". Water is typically a monodentate ligand, i.e., it forms only one bond with the central atom.

=== Organic chemistry ===
As a hard base, water reacts readily with organic carbocations; for example in a hydration reaction, a hydroxyl group (OH^{−}) and an acidic proton are added to the two carbon atoms bonded together in the carbon-carbon double bond, resulting in an alcohol. When the addition of water to an organic molecule cleaves the molecule in two, hydrolysis is said to occur. Notable examples of hydrolysis are the saponification of fats and the digestion of proteins and polysaccharides. Water can also be a leaving group in S_{N}2 substitution and E2 elimination reactions; the latter is then known as a dehydration reaction.

=== Water in redox reactions ===
Water contains hydrogen in the oxidation state +1 and oxygen in the oxidation state −2. It oxidizes chemicals such as hydrides, alkali metals, and some alkaline earth metals. One example of an alkali metal reacting with water is:

2 Na + 2 H_{2}O → H_{2} + 2 Na^{+} + 2 OH^{−}

Some other reactive metals, such as aluminium and beryllium, are oxidized by water as well, but their oxides adhere to the metal and form a passive protective layer. Note that the rusting of iron is a reaction between iron and oxygen that is dissolved in water, not between iron and water.

Water can be oxidized to emit oxygen gas, but very few oxidants react with water even if their reduction potential is greater than the potential of O_{2}/H_{2}O. Almost all such reactions require a catalyst. An example of the oxidation of water is:

4 AgF_{2} + 2 H_{2}O → 4 AgF + 4 HF + O_{2}

=== Electrolysis ===
Water can be split into its constituent elements, hydrogen and oxygen, by passing an electric current through it. This process is called electrolysis. The cathode half reaction is:

2 H^{+} + 2 e^{−} → H_{2}

The anode half reaction is:

2 H_{2}O → O_{2} + 4 H^{+} + 4 e^{−}

The gases produced bubble to the surface, where they can be collected or ignited with a flame above the water if this was the intention. The required potential for the electrolysis of pure water is 1.23 V at 25 °C. The operating potential is actually 1.48 V or higher in practical electrolysis.

== History ==
Henry Cavendish showed that water was composed of oxygen and hydrogen in 1781. The first decomposition of water into hydrogen and oxygen, by electrolysis, was done in 1800 by English chemist William Nicholson and Anthony Carlisle. In 1805, Joseph Louis Gay-Lussac and Alexander von Humboldt showed that water is composed of two parts hydrogen and one part oxygen.

Gilbert Newton Lewis isolated the first sample of pure heavy water in 1933.

The properties of water have historically been used to define various temperature scales. Notably, the Kelvin, Celsius, Rankine, and Fahrenheit scales were, or currently are, defined by the freezing and boiling points of water. The less-common scales of Delisle, Newton, Réaumur, and Rømer were defined similarly. The triple point of water is a more commonly used standard point today.

== Nomenclature ==
The accepted IUPAC name of water is oxidane or simply water, or its equivalent in different languages, although there are other systematic names which can be used to describe the molecule. Oxidane is only intended to be used as the name of the mononuclear parent hydride used for naming derivatives of water by substituent nomenclature. These derivatives commonly have other recommended names. For example, the name hydroxyl is recommended over oxidanyl for the –OH group. The name oxane is explicitly mentioned by the IUPAC as being unsuitable for this purpose, since it is already the preferred name of a cyclic ether also known as tetrahydropyran.

The simplest systematic name of water is hydrogen oxide. This is analogous to related compounds such as hydrogen peroxide, hydrogen sulfide, and deuterium oxide (heavy water). Using chemical nomenclature for type I ionic binary compounds, water would take the name hydrogen monoxide, but this is not among the names published by the International Union of Pure and Applied Chemistry (IUPAC). Another name is dihydrogen monoxide, which is a rarely used name of water, and mostly used in the dihydrogen monoxide parody.

Other systematic names for water include hydroxic acid, hydroxylic acid, and hydrogen hydroxide, using acid and base names. (Note: Both acid and base names exist for water because it is amphoteric (able to react both as an acid or an alkali).) None of these exotic names are used widely. The polarized form of the water molecule, H^{+}OH^{−}, is also called hydron hydroxide by IUPAC nomenclature.

Water substance is a rare term used for H_{2}O when one does not wish to specify the phase of matter (liquid water, water vapor, some form of ice, or a component in a mixture) though the term water is also used with this general meaning.

Oxygen dihydride is another way of referring to water, but modern usage often restricts the term "hydride" to ionic compounds (which water is not).

== See also ==
- Chemical bonding of water
- Dihydrogen monoxide parody
- Double-distilled water
- Electromagnetic absorption by water
- Fluid dynamics
- Hard water
- Heavy water
- Hydrogen polyoxide
- Ice
- Optical properties of water and ice
- Steam
- Superheated water
- Tritiated water
- Viscosity § Water
- Water (data page)
- Water cluster
- Water dimer
- Water model
- Water thread experiment
