= Water cluster =

Cluster of water molecules held together through hydrogen bonding

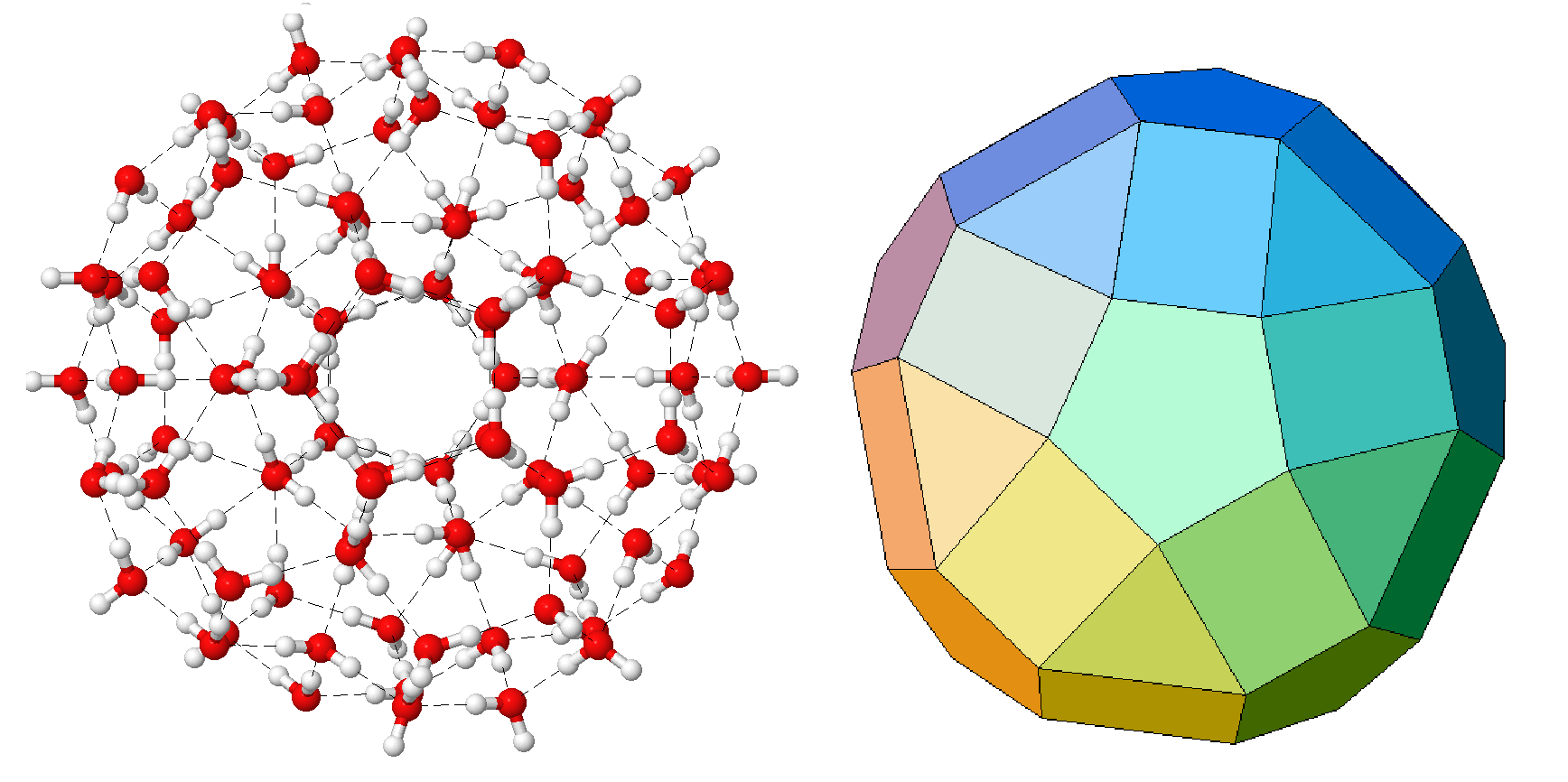
Hypothetical (H_{2}O)_{100} icosahedral water cluster and the underlying structure.

In chemistry, a water cluster is a discrete hydrogen bonded assembly or cluster of molecules of water. Many such clusters have been predicted by theoretical models (in silico), and some have been detected experimentally in various contexts such as ice, bulk liquid water, in the gas phase, in dilute mixtures with non-polar solvents, and as water of hydration in crystal lattices. The simplest example is the water dimer (H_{2}O)_{2}.

Water clusters have been proposed as an explanation for some anomalous properties of liquid water, such as its unusual variation of density with temperature. Water clusters are also implicated in the stabilization of certain supramolecular structures. They are expected to play a role also in the hydration of molecules and ions dissolved in water.

== Theoretical predictions ==
Detailed water models predict the occurrence of water clusters, as configurations of water molecules whose total energy is a local minimum.

Of particular interest are the cyclic clusters (H_{2}O)_{n}; these have been predicted to exist for n = 3 to 60. At low temperatures, nearly 50% of water molecules are included in clusters. With increasing cluster size the oxygen to oxygen distance is found to decrease which is attributed to so-called cooperative many-body interactions: due to a change in charge distribution the H-acceptor molecule becomes a better H-donor molecule with each expansion of the water assembly. Many isomeric forms seem to exist for the hexamer (H_{2}O)_{6}: from ring, book, bag, cage, to prism shape with nearly identical energy. Two cage-like isomers exist for heptamers (H_{2}O)_{7}, and octamers (H_{2}O)_{8} are found either cyclic or in the shape of a cube.

Other theoretical studies predict clusters with more complex three-dimensional structures. Examples include the fullerene-like cluster (H_{2}O)_{28}, named the water buckyball, and the 280-water-molecule monster icosahedral network (with each water molecule coordinate to 4 others). The latter, which is 3 nm in diameter, consists of nested icosahedral shells with 280 and 100 molecules. There is also an augmented version with another shell of 320 molecules. There is increased stability with the addition of each shell. There are theoretical models of water clusters of more than 700 water molecules, but they have not been observed experimentally. One line of research uses graph invariants for generating hydrogen bond topologies and predicting physical properties of water clusters and ice. The utility of graph invariants was shown in a study considering the (H_{2}O)_{6} cage and (H_{2}O)_{20} dodecahedron, which are associated with roughly the same oxygen atom arrangements as in the solid and liquid phases of water.

== Experimental observations ==
Experimental study of any supramolecular structures in bulk water is difficult because of their short lifetime: the hydrogen bonds are continually breaking and reforming at timescales faster than 200 femtoseconds.

Nevertheless, water clusters have been observed in the gas phase and in dilute mixtures of water and non-polar solvents like benzene and liquid helium. The experimental detection and characterization of the clusters has been achieved by spectroscopy - far-infrared (FIR) and vibration-rotation-tunneling (VRT) - and by H-NMR and neutron diffraction. The hexamer is found to have planar geometry in liquid helium, a chair conformation in organic solvents, and a cage structure in the gas phase. Experiments combining IR spectroscopy with mass spectrometry reveal cubic configurations for clusters in the range n=(8-10).

When the water is part of a crystal structure as in a hydrate, x-ray diffraction can be used. Conformation of a water heptamer was determined (cyclic twisted nonplanar) using this method. Further, multi-layered water clusters with formulae (H_{2}O)_{100} trapped inside cavities of several polyoxometalate clusters were also reported by Mueller et al.

== Cluster models of bulk liquid water ==
Several models attempt to account for the bulk properties of water by assuming that they are dominated by cluster formation within the liquid. According to the quantum cluster equilibrium (QCE) theory of liquids, n=8 clusters dominate the liquid water bulk phase, followed by n=5 and n=6 clusters. Near the triple point, the presence of an n=24 cluster is invoked. In another model, bulk water is built up from a mixture of hexamer and pentamer rings containing cavities capable of enclosing small solutes. In yet another model an equilibrium exists between a cubic water octamer and two cyclic tetramers. However, none of these models yet have reproduced the experimentally-observed density maximum of water as a function of temperature.

== See also ==
- Hydrogen bond
- Mpemba effect
- Properties of water
- Richard J. Saykally
