= Water (data page) =

Chemical data page for water

This page provides supplementary data to the article properties of water.

Further comprehensive authoritative data can be found at the NIST Chemistry WebBook page on thermophysical properties of fluids.

== Structure and properties ==
Structure and properties
Index of refraction, n_{D}	1.333 at 20 °C
Dielectric constant	88.00 at 0 °C; 86.04 at 5 °C; 84.11 at 10 °C; 82.22 at 15 °C; 80.36 at 20 °C; 78.54 at 25 °C; 76.75 at 30 °C; 75.00 at 35 °C; 73.28 at 40 °C; 71.59 at 45 °C; 69.94 at 50 °C; 66.74 at 60 °C; 63.68 at 70 °C; 60.76 at 80 °C; 57.98 at 90 °C; 55.33 at 100 °C
Bond strength	492.215 kJ/mol O–H bond dissociation energy
Bond length	95.87 pm (equilibrium)
Bond angle	104.48° (equilibrium)
Magnetic susceptibility	−9.04 × 10^{−6} volume SI units

== Thermodynamic properties ==
Phase behavior
Triple point	273.16 K (0.01 °C), 611.73 Pa
Critical point	647 K (374 °C), 22.1 MPa
Enthalpy change of fusion at 273.15 K, Δ_{fus}H	6.01 kJ/mol
Entropy change of fusion at 273.15 K, 1 bar, Δ_{fus}S	22.0 J/(mol·K)
Std enthalpy change of vaporization, Δ_{vap}H^{~~o~~}	44.0 kJ/mol
Enthalpy change of vaporization at 373.15 K, Δ_{vap}H	40.68 kJ/mol
Std entropy change of vaporization, Δ_{vap}S^{~~o~~}	118.89 J/(mol·K)
Entropy change of vaporization at 373.15 K, Δ_{vap}S	109.02 J/(mol·K)
Enthalpy change of sublimation at 273.15 K, Δ_{sub}H	51.1 kJ/mol
Std entropy change of sublimation at 273.15 K, 1 bar, Δ_{sub}S	~144 J/(mol·K)
Molal freezing point constant	−1.858 °C kg/mol
Molal boiling point constant	0.512 °C kg/mol
Solid properties
Std enthalpy change of formation, Δ_{f}H^{~~o~~}_{solid}	−291.83 kJ/mol
Standard molar entropy, S^{~~o~~}_{solid}	41 J/(mol K)
Heat capacity, c_{p}	12.2 J/(mol K) at −200 °C; 15.0 J/(mol K) at −180 °C; 17.3 J/(mol K) at −160 °C; 19.8 J/(mol K) at −140 °C; 24.8 J/(mol K) at −100 °C; 29.6 J/(mol K) at −60 °C; 32.77 J/(mol K) at −38.3 °C; 33.84 J/(mol K) at −30.6 °C; 35.20 J/(mol K) at −20.8 °C; 36.66 J/(mol K) at −11.0 °C; 37.19 J/(mol K) at −4.9 °C; 37.84 J/(mol K) at −2.2 °C
Liquid properties
Std enthalpy change of formation, Δ_{f}H^{~~o~~}_{liquid}	−285.83 kJ/mol
Standard molar entropy, S^{~~o~~}_{liquid}	69.95 J/(mol K)
Heat capacity, c_{p}	75.97 J/(mol K) and 4.2176 J/(g·K) at 0 °C; 75.52 J/(mol K) and 4.1921 J/(g·K) at 10 °C; 75.33 J/(mol K) and 4.1818 J/(g·K) at 20 °C; 75.28 J/(mol K) and 4.1787 J/(g·K) at 25 °C; 75.26 J/(mol K) and 4.1784 J/(g·K) at 30 °C; 75.26 J/(mol K) and 4.1785 J/(g·K) at 40 °C; 75.30 J/(mol K) and 4.1806 J/(g·K) at 50 °C; 75.37 J/(mol K) and 4.1843 J/(g·K) at 60 °C; 75.46 J/(mol K) and 4.1895 J/(g·K) at 70 °C; 75.58 J/(mol K) and 4.1963 J/(g·K) at 80 °C; 75.74 J/(mol K) and 4.2050 J/(g·K) at 90 °C; 75.94 J/(mol K) and 4.2159 J/(g·K) at 100 °C
Gas properties
Std enthalpy change of formation, Δ_{f}H^{~~o~~}_{gas}	−241.83 kJ/mol
Standard molar entropy, S^{~~o~~}_{gas}	188.84 J/(mol K)
Heat capacity, c_{p}	36.5 J/(mol K) at 100 °C; 36.1 J/(mol K) at 200 °C; 36.2 J/(mol K) at 400 °C; 37.9 J/(mol K) at 700 °C; 41.4 J/(mol K) at 1000 °C
Heat capacity, c_{v}	27.5 J/(mol K) at 100 °C; 27.6 J/(mol K) at 200 °C; 27.8 J/(mol K) at 400 °C; 29.5 J/(mol K) at 700 °C; 33.1 J/(mol K) at 1000 °C
Heat capacity ratio, γ = c_{p}/c_{v}	1.324 at 100 °C; 1.310 at 200 °C; 1.301 at 400 °C; 1.282 at 700 °C; 1.252 at 1000 °C
van der Waals' constants	a = 553.6 L^{2} kPa/mol^{2} b = 0.03049 L/mol

== Liquid physical properties ==
Temperature dependence of the surface tension of pure water

Temperature dependence of the density of ice and water

Velocity of sound in water
c in distilled water at 25 °C	1498 m/s
c at other temperatures	1403 m/s at 0 °C; 1427 m/s at 5 °C; 1447 m/s at 10 °C; 1481 m/s at 20 °C; 1507 m/s at 30 °C; 1526 m/s at 40 °C; 1541 m/s at 50 °C; 1552 m/s at 60 °C; 1555 m/s at 70 °C; 1555 m/s at 80 °C; 1550 m/s at 90 °C; 1543 m/s at 100 °C
Density
0.983854 g/cm^{3} at −30 °C	0.99221 g/cm^{3} at 40 °C
0.993547 g/cm^{3} at −20 °C	0.99022 g/cm^{3} at 45 °C
0.998117 g/cm^{3} at −10 °C	0.98804 g/cm^{3} at 50 °C
0.9998395 g/cm^{3} at 0 °C	0.98570 g/cm^{3} at 55 °C
0.999972 g/cm^{3} at 3.984 °C
0.9999720 g/cm^{3} at 4 °C	0.98321 g/cm^{3} at 60 °C
0.99996 g/cm^{3} at 5 °C	0.98056 g/cm^{3} at 65 °C
0.9997026 g/cm^{3} at 10 °C	0.97778 g/cm^{3} at 70 °C
0.9991026 g/cm^{3} at 15 °C	0.97486 g/cm^{3} at 75 °C
0.9982071 g/cm^{3} at 20 °C	0.97180 g/cm^{3} at 80 °C
0.9977735 g/cm^{3} at 22 °C	0.96862 g/cm^{3} at 85 °C
0.9970479 g/cm^{3} at 25 °C	0.96531 g/cm^{3} at 90 °C
0.9956502 g/cm^{3} at 30 °C	0.96189 g/cm^{3} at 95 °C
0.99403 g/cm^{3} at 35 °C	0.95835 g/cm^{3} at 100 °C
The values below 0 °C refer to supercooled water.
Viscosity
1.7921 mPa·s (cP) at 0 °C	0.5494 mPa·s at 50 °C
1.5188 mPa·s at 5 °C	0.5064 mPa·s at 55 °C
1.3077 mPa·s at 10 °C	0.4688 mPa·s at 60 °C
1.1404 mPa·s at 15 °C	0.4355 mPa·s at 65 °C
1.0050 mPa·s at 20 °C	0.4061 mPa·s at 70 °C
0.8937 mPa·s at 25 °C	0.3799 mPa·s at 75 °C
0.8007 mPa·s at 30 °C	0.3635 mPa·s at 80 °C
0.7225 mPa·s at 35 °C	0.3355 mPa·s at 85 °C
0.6560 mPa·s at 40 °C	0.3165 mPa·s at 90 °C
0.5988 mPa·s at 45 °C	0.2994 mPa·s at 95 °C
	0.2838 mPa·s at 100 °C
Surface tension
75.64 dyn/cm at 0 °C	69.56 dyn/cm at 40 °C
74.92 dyn/cm at 5 °C	68.74 dyn/cm at 45 °C
74.22 dyn/cm at 10 °C	67.91 dyn/cm at 50 °C
73.49 dyn/cm at 15 °C	66.18 dyn/cm at 60 °C
72.75 dyn/cm at 20 °C	64.42 dyn/cm at 70 °C
71.97 dyn/cm at 25 °C	62.61 dyn/cm at 80 °C
71.18 dyn/cm at 30 °C	60.75 dyn/cm at 90 °C
70.38 dyn/cm at 35 °C	58.85 dyn/cm at 100 °C

Electrical conductivity of highly purified water at saturation pressure
Temperature, °C	Conductivity, μS/m
0.01	1.15
25	5.50
100	76.5
200	299
300	241

== Water/steam equilibrium properties ==
Vapor pressure formula for steam in equilibrium with liquid water:

$$\log_{10} P = A - \frac{B}{T - C},$$

where P is equilibrium vapor pressure in kPa, and T is temperature in kelvins.

For T = 273 K to 333 K: A = 7.2326; B = 1750.286; C = 38.1.

For T = 333 K to 423 K: A = 7.0917; B = 1668.21; C = 45.1.

Steam table
Temperature (°C)	Pressure (kPa)	H of liquid (J/g)	Δ_{vap}H (J/g)	W_{vap} (J/g)	ρ of vapor (kg/m^{3})
0	0.612	0.00	2496.5	126.0	0.004855
10	1.227	42.0	2473.5	130.5	0.009498
20	2.336	83.8	2450.9	135.1	0.01728
30	4.242	125.6	2427.9	139.7	0.03037
40	7.370	167.2	2404.9	144.2	0.05107
50	12.33	209.0	2381.4	148.7	0.08275
60	19.90	250.8	2357.6	153.0	0.1300
70	31.15	292.7	2332.9	157.3	0.1979
80	46.12	334.6	2307.7	161.5	0.2930
90	70.10	376.6	2282.6	165.5	0.4232
100	101.32	419.0	2256.3	169.4	0.5974
110	143.27	460.8	2229.5	173.1	0.8264
120	198.50	503.2	2201.4	176.7	1.121
130	270.13	545.8	2172.5	180.2	1.497
140	361.4	588.5	2142.8	183.2	1.967
150	476.0	631.5	2111.8	186.1	2.548
160	618.1	674.7	2080.0	188.7	3.263
170	792.0	718.5	2047.0	190.6	4.023
180	1002.7	762.5	2012.2	192.8	5.165
190	1254.9	807.0	1975.8	194.5	6.402
200	1554.3	851.9	1937.3	195.6	7.868
210	1907.9	897.5	1897.5	196.3	9.606
221.1	2369.8	948.5	1850.2	196.6	11.88
229.4	2769.6	987.9	1812.5	196.2	13.87
240.6	3381.1	1040.6	1759.4	195.1	16.96
248.9	3904.1	1080.3	1715.8	193.7	19.66
260.0	4695.9	1134.8	1653.9	190.8	23.84
271.1	5603.4	1195.9	1586.5	186.9	28.83
279.4	6366.5	1240.7	1532.5	183.3	33.18
290.6	7506.2	1302.3	1456.3	177.4	39.95
298.9	8463.9	1350.0	1394.8	172.2	45.93
310.0	9878.0	1415.7	1307.7	164.2	55.25
321.1	11461	1483.9	1212.7	154.5	66.58
329.4	12785	1537.9	1133.2	145.6	76.92
340.6	14727	1617.9	1007.6	130.9	94.25
348.9	16331	1687.0	892.0	117.0	111.5
360.0	18682	1797.0	694.0	91.0	145.3
371.1	21349	1968.3	365.0	47.0	214.5
374.4	22242	2151.2	0	0	306.8
Temperature (°C)	Pressure (kPa)	H of liquid (J/g)	Δ_{vap}H (J/g)	W_{vap} (J/g)	ρ of vapor (kg/m^{3})

Data in the table above is given for water–steam equilibria at various temperatures over the entire temperature range at which liquid water can exist. Pressure of the equilibrium is given in the second column in kPa. The third column is the heat content of each gram of the liquid phase relative to water at 0 °C. The fourth column is the heat of vaporization of each gram of liquid that changes to vapor. The fifth column is the work PΔV done by each gram of liquid that changes to vapor. The sixth column is the density of the vapor.

== Melting point of ice at various pressures ==
Data obtained from CRC Handbook of Chemistry and Physics 44th ed., p. 2390.

Pressure kPa	Temp. °C
101.325	0.0
32950	−2.5
60311	−5.0
87279	−7.5
113267	−10.0
138274	−12.5
159358	−15.0
179952	−17.5
200251	−20.0
215746	−22.1

== Table of various forms of ice ==
Properties of various forms of ice
Ice form	Density g/cm^{3}	Crystal structure	Triple points	TP temp °C	TP pressure MPa
I_{h}	0.92	hexagonal	Lq, Vap, I_{h}	0.01	0.000612
I_{h}	0.92	hexagonal	Lq, I_{h}, III	−22.0	207.5
I_{h}	0.92	hexagonal	I_{h}, II, III	−34.7	212.9
I_{c}	0.92	cubic
II	1.17	rhombohedral	I_{h}, II, III	−34.7	212.9
II	1.17	rhombohedral	II, III, V	−24.3	344.3
II	1.17	rhombohedral	II, V, VI	−55 (est)	620
III	1.14	tetragonal	Lq, I_{h}, III	−22.0	207.5
III	1.14	tetragonal	Lq, III, V	−17	346.3
III	1.14	tetragonal	I_{h}, II, III	−34.7	212.9
III	1.14	tetragonal	II, III, V	−24.3	344.3
IV	1.27	rhombohedral
V	1.23	monoclinic	Lq, III, V	−17	346.3
V	1.23	monoclinic	Lq, V, VI	0.16	625.9
V	1.23	monoclinic	II, III, V	−24.3	344.3
V	1.23	monoclinic	II, V, VI	−55 (est)	620
VI	1.31	tetragonal	Lq, V, VI	0.16	625.9
VI	1.31	tetragonal	Lq, VI, VII	81.6	2200
VI	1.31	tetragonal	II, V, VI	−55 (est)	620
VI	1.31	tetragonal	VI, VII, VIII	≈5	2100
VII	1.50	cubic	Lq, VI, VII	81.6	2200
VII	1.50	cubic	VI, VII, VIII	≈5	2100
VII	1.50	cubic	VII, VIII, X	−173	62000
VIII	1.46	tetragonal	VI, VII, VIII	≈5	2100
VIII	1.46	tetragonal	VII, VIII, X	−173	62000
IX	1.16	tetragonal
X	2.46	cubic	VII, VIII, X	−173	62000
XI^{‡}	0.92	orthorhombic	Vap, I_{h}, XI	−201.5	0 (expected)
XII	1.29	tetragonal
XIII	1.23	monoclinic
XIV	1.29	orthorhombic

^{‡}Ice XI triple point is theoretical and has never been obtained

== Phase diagram ==
Log-lin pressure–temperature phase diagram of water. The Roman numerals indicate various ice phases.

== Water with dissolved NaCl ==
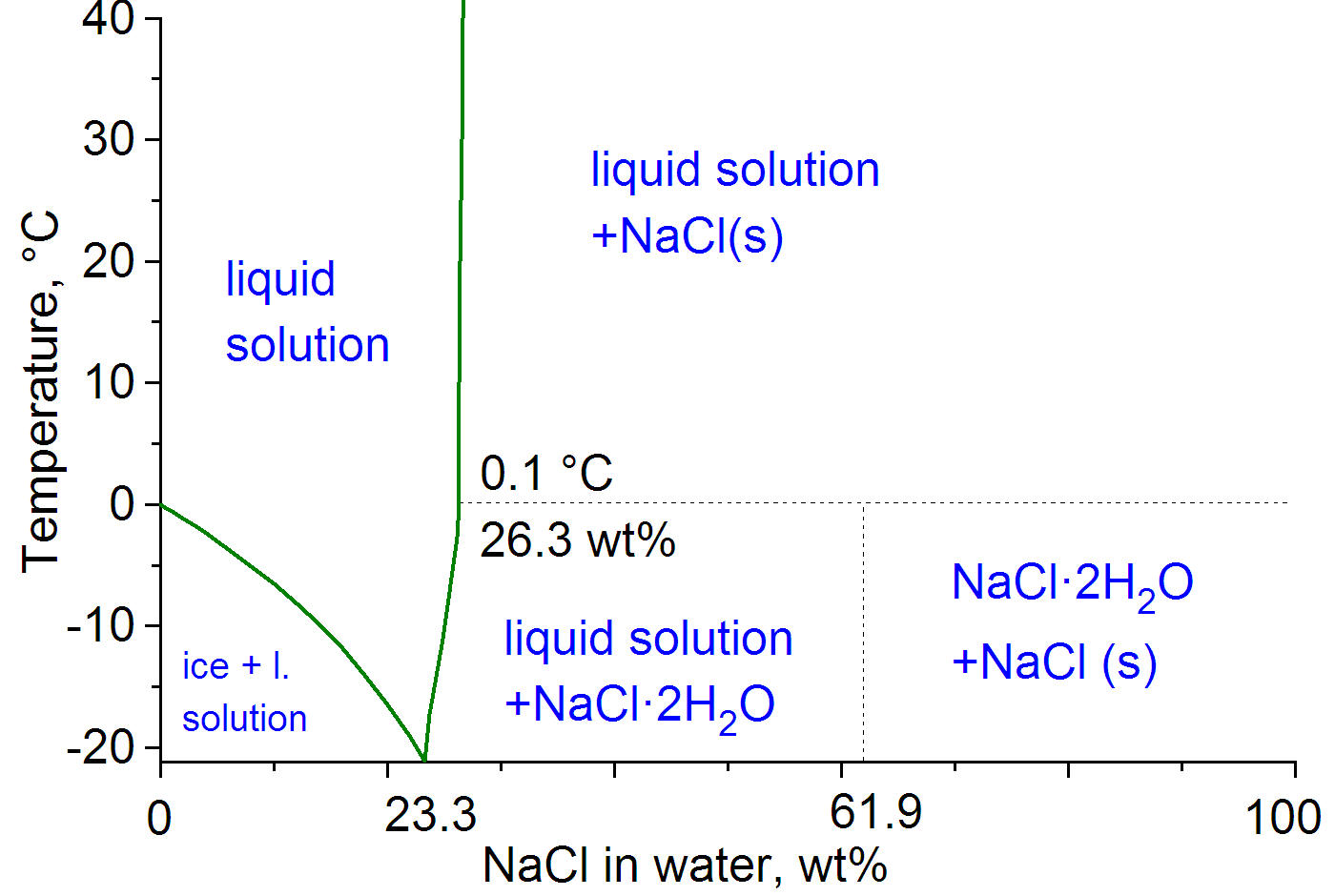
Water–NaCl phase diagram

Properties of water–NaCl mixtures
NaCl, wt%	T_{eq}, °C	ρ, g/cm^{3}	n	η, mPa·s
0	0	0.99984	1.333	1.002
0.5	−0.3	1.0018	1.3339	1.011
1	−0.59	1.0053	1.3347	1.02
2	−1.19	1.0125	1.3365	1.036
3	−1.79	1.0196	1.3383	1.052
4	−2.41	1.0268	1.34	1.068
5	−3.05	1.034	1.3418	1.085
6	−3.7	1.0413	1.3435	1.104
7	−4.38	1.0486	1.3453	1.124
8	−5.08	1.0559	1.347	1.145
9	−5.81	1.0633	1.3488	1.168
10	−6.56	1.0707	1.3505	1.193
12	−8.18	1.0857	1.3541	1.25
14	−9.94	1.1008	1.3576	1.317
16	−11.89	1.1162	1.3612	1.388
18	−14.04	1.1319	1.3648	1.463
20	−16.46	1.1478	1.3684	1.557
22	−19.18	1.164	1.3721	1.676
23.3	−21.1			
23.7	−17.3			
24.9	−11.1			
26.1	−2.7			
26.28	0			
26.32	10			
26.41	20			
26.45	25			
26.52	30			
26.67	40			
26.84	50			
27.03	60			
27.25	70			
27.5	80			
27.78	90			
28.05	100			

Note: ρ is density, n is refractive index at 589 nm, and η is viscosity, all at 20 °C; T_{eq} is the equilibrium temperature between two phases: ice/liquid solution for T_{eq} < 0–0.1 °C and NaCl/liquid solution for T_{eq} above 0.1 °C.

== Self-ionization ==

°C	−35	0	25	60	300 (~50 MPa)
pK_{w}	17	14.9	14.0	13.0	12

$$pK_w = -\log ( [\mathrm{H}^+] [\mathrm{OH}^-] )$$

== Spectral data ==
UV-Vis
λ_{max}
? nm
Extinction coefficient, ε
?
IR
Major absorption bands

vapor:	ν_{1} = 3657.05,	ν_{2} = 1594.75,	ν_{3} = 3755.93	cm^{−1}
liquid:	ν_{1} = 3280,	ν_{2} = 1644,	ν_{3} = 3490	cm^{−1}
hexagonal ice:	ν_{1} = 3085,	ν_{2} = 1650,	ν_{3} = 3220	cm^{−1}

NMR
Proton NMR
4.79 ppm in D_{2}O; 1.56 ppm in CDCl_{3}; 0.40 ppm in C_{6}D_{6}; 4.87 in CD_{3}OD
Carbon-13 NMR
N/A
Other NMR data

MS
Masses of
main fragments

== Self-diffusion coefficients ==
Experimental self-diffusion coefficients at various temperatures
Temperature in °C	Coefficients in 10^{−9} m^{2}/s
0	1.099
1	1.138
4	1.261
5	1.303
10	1.525
15	1.765
20	2.023
25	2.299
30	2.594
35	2.907
40	3.238
45	3.588
50	3.956
56	4.423
60	4.748
70	5.615
80	6.557
90	7.574
100	8.667

== Additional data translated from German "Wasser (Stoffdaten)" page ==
The data that follows was copied and translated from the German language Wikipedia version of this page (which has moved to here). It provides supplementary physical, thermodynamic, and vapor pressure data, some of which is redundant with data in the tables above, and some of which is additional.

=== Physical and thermodynamic tables ===
In the following tables, values are temperature-dependent and to a lesser degree pressure-dependent, and are arranged by state of aggregation (s = solid, lq = liquid, g = gas), which are clearly a function of temperature and pressure. All of the data were computed from data given in "Formulation of the Thermodynamic Properties of Ordinary Water Substance for Scientific and General Use" (IAPWS, 1984) (obsolete as of 1995). This applies to:

- T – temperature in degrees Celsius
- V – specific volume in cubic decimeters per kilogram (1 dm^{3} is equivalent to 1 liter)
- H – specific enthalpy in kilojoules per kilogram
- U – specific internal energy in kilojoules per kilogram
- S – specific entropy in kilojoules per kilogram-kelvin
- c_{p} – specific heat capacity at constant pressure in kilojoules per kilogram-kelvin
- γ – Thermal expansion coefficient as 10^{−3} per kelvin
- λ – Heat conductivity in milliwatts per meter-kelvin
- η – Viscosity in micropascal-seconds (1 cP = 1000 μPa·s)
- σ – surface tension in millinewtons per meter (equivalent to dyn/cm)

==== Standard conditions ====
In the following table, material data are given for standard pressure of 0.1 MPa (equivalent to 1 bar). Up to 99.63 °C (the boiling point of water at 0.1 MPa), at this pressure water exists as a liquid. Above that, it exists as water vapor. Note that the boiling point of 100.0 °C is at a pressure of 0.101325 MPa (1 atm), which is the average atmospheric pressure.

Water/steam data table at standard pressure (0.1 MPa)
T °C		V dm^{3}/kg	H kJ/kg	U kJ/kg	S kJ/(kg·K)	c_{p} kJ/(kg·K)	γ 10^{−3}/K	λ mW / (m·K)	η μPa·s	σ ^{‡} mN/m
0	lq	1.0002	0.06	−0.04	−0.0001	4.228	−0.080	561.0	1792	75.65
5	lq	1.0000	21.1	21.0	0.076	4.200	0.011	570.6	1518	74.95
10	lq	1.0003	42.1	42.0	0.151	4.188	0.087	580.0	1306	74.22
15	lq	1.0009	63.0	62.9	0.224	4.184	0.152	589.4	1137	73.49
20	lq	1.0018	83.9	83.8	0.296	4.183	0.209	598.4	1001	72.74
25	lq	1.0029	104.8	104.7	0.367	4.183	0.259	607.2	890.4	71.98
30	lq	1.0044	125.8	125.7	0.437	4.183	0.305	615.5	797.7	71.20
35	lq	1.0060	146.7	146.6	0.505	4.183	0.347	623.3	719.6	70.41
40	lq	1.0079	167.6	167.5	0.572	4.182	0.386	630.6	653.3	69.60
45	lq	1.0099	188.5	188.4	0.638	4.182	0.423	637.3	596.3	68.78
50	lq	1.0121	209.4	209.3	0.704	4.181	0.457	643.6	547.1	67.95
60	lq	1.0171	251.2	251.1	0.831	4.183	0.522	654.4	466.6	66.24
70	lq	1.0227	293.1	293.0	0.955	4.187	0.583	663.1	404.1	64.49
80	lq	1.0290	335.0	334.9	1.075	4.194	0.640	670.0	354.5	62.68
90	lq	1.0359	377.0	376.9	1.193	4.204	0.696	675.3	314.6	60.82
99.63	lq	1.0431	417.5	417.4	1.303	4.217	0.748	679.0	283.0	58.99
99.63	g	1694.3	2675	2505	7.359	2.043	2.885	25.05	12.26	–
100	g	1696.1	2675	2506	7.361	2.042	2.881	25.08	12.27	58.92
200	g	2172.3	2874	2657	7.833	1.975	2.100	33.28	16.18	37.68
300	g	2638.8	3073	2810	8.215	2.013	1.761	43.42	20.29	14.37
500	g	3565.5	3488	3131	8.834	2.135	1.297	66.970	28.57	–
750	g	4721.0	4043	3571	9.455	2.308	0.978	100.30	38.48	–
1000	g	5875.5	4642	4054	9.978	2.478	0.786	136.3	47.66	–
^{‡} The values for surface tension for the liquid section of the table are for a liquid/air interface. Values for the gas section of the table are for a liquid/saturated steam interface.

==== Triple point ====
In the following table, material data are given with a pressure of 611.7 Pa (equivalent to 0.006117 bar). Up to a temperature of 0.01 °C, the triple point of water, water normally exists as ice, except for supercooled water, for which one data point is tabulated here. At the triple point, ice can exist together with both liquid water and vapor. At higher temperatures, the data are for water vapor only.

Water/steam data table at triple point pressure (0.0006117 MPa)
T °C		V dm^{3}/kg	H kJ/kg	U kJ/kg	S kJ/(kg·K)	c_{p} kJ/(kg·K)	γ 10^{−3}/K	λ mW / (m·K)	η μPa·s
0	lq	1.0002	−0.04	−0.04	−0.0002	4.339	−0.081	561.0	1792
0.01	s	1.0908	−333.4	−333.4	−1.221	1.93	0.1	2180	–
0.01	lq	1.0002	0.0	0	0	4.229	−0.080	561.0	1791
0.01	g	205986	2500	2374	9.154	1.868	3.672	17.07	9.22
5	g	209913	2509	2381	9.188	1.867	3.605	17.33	9.34
10	g	213695	2519	2388	9.222	1.867	3.540	17.60	9.46
15	g	217477	2528	2395	9.254	1.868	3.478	17.88	9.59
20	g	221258	2537	2402	9.286	1.868	3.417	18.17	9.73
25	g	225039	2547	2409	9.318	1.869	3.359	18.47	9.87
30	g	228819	2556	2416	9.349	1.869	3.304	18.78	10.02
35	g	232598	2565	2423	9.380	1.870	3.249	19.10	10.17
40	g	236377	2575	2430	9.410	1.871	3.197	19.43	10.32
45	g	240155	2584	2437	9.439	1.872	3.147	19.77	10.47
50	g	243933	2593	2444	9.469	1.874	3.098	20.11	10.63
60	g	251489	2612	2459	9.526	1.876	3.004	20.82	10.96
70	g	259043	2631	2473	9.581	1.880	2.916	21.56	11.29
80	g	266597	2650	2487	9.635	1.883	2.833	22.31	11.64
90	g	274150	2669	2501	9.688	1.887	2.755	23.10	11.99
100	g	281703	2688	2515	9.739	1.891	2.681	23.90	12.53
200	g	357216	2879	2661	10.194	1.940	2.114	32.89	16.21
300	g	432721	3076	2811	10.571	2.000	1.745	43.26	20.30
500	g	583725	3489	3132	11.188	2.131	1.293	66.90	28.57
750	g	772477	4043	3571	11.808	2.307	0.977	100.20	38.47
1000	g	961227	4642	4054	12.331	2.478	0.785	136.30	47.66

=== Saturated vapor pressure ===
The following table is based on different, complementary sources and approximation formulas, whose values are of various quality and accuracy. The values in the temperature range of −100 °C to 100 °C were inferred from D. Sunday (1982) and are quite uniform and exact. The values in the temperature range of the boiling point of water up to the critical point (100 °C to 374 °C) are drawn from different sources and are substantially less accurate; hence they should be used only as approximate values.

To use the values correctly, consider the following points:

- The values apply only to smooth interfaces and in the absence other gases or gas mixtures such as air. Hence they apply only to pure phases and need a correction factor for systems in which air is present.
- The values were not computed according formulas widely used in the US, but using somewhat more exact formulas (see below), which can also be used to compute further values in the appropriate temperature ranges.
- The saturated vapor pressure over water in the temperature range of −100 °C to −50 °C is only extrapolated [Translator's note: Supercooled liquid water is not known to exist below −42 °C].
- The values have various units (Pa, hPa or bar), which must be considered when reading them.

==== Formulas ====
The table values for −100 °C to 100 °C were computed by the following formulas, where T is in kelvins and vapor pressures, P_{w} and P_{i}, are in pascals.

Over liquid water

log_{e}(P_{w}) = −6094.4642 T^{−1} + 21.1249952 − 2.724552×10^{−2} T + 1.6853396×10^{−5} T^{2} + 2.4575506 log_{e}(T)

For temperature range: 173.15 K to 373.15 K or equivalently −100 °C to 100 °C

Over ice

log_{e}(P_{i}) = −5504.4088 T^{−1} − 3.5704628 − 1.7337458×10^{−2} T + 6.5204209×10^{−6} T^{2} + 6.1295027 log_{e}(T)

For temperature range: 173.15 K to 273.15 K or equivalently −100 °C to 0 °C

At triple point

An important basic value, which is not registered in the table, is the saturated vapor pressure at the triple point of water. The internationally accepted value according to measurements of Guildner, Johnson and Jones (1976) amounts to:

P_{w}(t_{tp} = 0.01 °C) = 611.657 Pa ± 0.010 Pa at (1 − α) = 99%

Values of saturated vapor pressure of water
Temp. T in °C	P_{i}(T) over ice in Pa	P_{w}(T) over water in Pa	Temp. T in °C	P_{w}(T) over water in hPa	Temp. T in °C	P(T) in bar	Temp. T in °C	P(T) in bar	Temp. T in °C	P(T) in bar
−100	0.0013957	0.0036309	0	6.11213	100	1.01	200	15.55	300	85.88
−99	0.0017094	0.0044121	1	6.57069	101	1.05	201	15.88	301	87.09
−98	0.0020889	0.0053487	2	7.05949	102	1.09	202	16.21	302	88.32
−97	0.0025470	0.0064692	3	7.58023	103	1.13	203	16.55	303	89.57
−96	0.0030987	0.0078067	4	8.13467	104	1.17	204	16.89	304	90.82
−95	0.0037617	0.0093996	5	8.72469	105	1.21	205	17.24	305	92.09
−94	0.0045569	0.011293	6	9.35222	106	1.25	206	17.60	306	93.38
−93	0.0055087	0.013538	7	10.0193	107	1.30	207	17.96	307	94.67
−92	0.0066455	0.016195	8	10.7280	108	1.34	208	18.32	308	95.98
−91	0.0080008	0.019333	9	11.4806	109	1.39	209	18.70	309	97.31
−90	0.0096132	0.023031	10	12.2794	110	1.43	210	19.07	310	98.65
−89	0.011528	0.027381	11	13.1267	111	1.48	211	19.46	311	100.00
−88	0.013797	0.032489	12	14.0251	112	1.53	212	19.85	312	101.37
−87	0.016482	0.038474	13	14.9772	113	1.58	213	20.25	313	102.75
−86	0.019653	0.045473	14	15.9856	114	1.64	214	20.65	314	104.15
−85	0.02339	0.053645	15	17.0532	115	1.69	215	21.06	315	105.56
−84	0.027788	0.063166	16	18.1829	116	1.75	216	21.47	316	106.98
−83	0.032954	0.074241	17	19.3778	117	1.81	217	21.89	317	108.43
−82	0.039011	0.087101	18	20.6409	118	1.86	218	22.32	318	109.88
−81	0.046102	0.10201	19	21.9757	119	1.93	219	22.75	319	111.35
−80	0.054388	0.11925	20	23.3854	120	1.99	220	23.19	320	112.84
−79	0.064057	0.13918	21	24.8737	121	2.05	221	23.64	321	114.34
−78	0.075320	0.16215	22	26.4442	122	2.12	222	24.09	322	115.86
−77	0.088419	0.18860	23	28.1006	123	2.18	223	24.55	323	117.39
−76	0.10363	0.21901	24	29.8470	124	2.25	224	25.02	324	118.94
−75	0.12127	0.25391	25	31.6874	125	2.32	225	25.49	325	120.51
−74	0.14168	0.29390	26	33.6260	126	2.40	226	25.98	326	122.09
−73	0.16528	0.33966	27	35.6671	127	2.47	227	26.46	327	123.68
−72	0.19252	0.39193	28	37.8154	128	2.55	228	26.96	328	125.30
−71	0.22391	0.45156	29	40.0754	129	2.62	229	27.46	329	126.93
−70	0.26004	0.51948	30	42.4520	130	2.70	230	27.97	330	128.58
−69	0.30156	0.59672	31	44.9502	131	2.78	231	28.48	331	130.24
−68	0.34921	0.68446	32	47.5752	132	2.87	232	29.01	332	131.92
−67	0.40383	0.78397	33	50.3322	133	2.95	233	29.54	333	133.62
−66	0.46633	0.89668	34	53.2267	134	3.04	234	30.08	334	135.33
−65	0.53778	1.0242	35	56.2645	135	3.13	235	30.62	335	137.07
−64	0.61933	1.1682	36	59.4513	136	3.22	236	31.18	336	138.82
−63	0.71231	1.3306	37	62.7933	137	3.32	237	31.74	337	140.59
−62	0.81817	1.5136	38	66.2956	138	3.42	238	32.31	338	142.37
−61	0.93854	1.7195	39	69.9675	139	3.51	239	32.88	339	144.18
−60	1.0753	1.9509	40	73.8127	140	3.62	240	33.47	340	146.00
−59	1.2303	2.2106	41	77.8319	141	3.72	241	34.06	341	147.84
−58	1.4060	2.5018	42	82.0536	142	3.82	242	34.66	342	149.71
−57	1.6049	2.8277	43	86.4633	143	3.93	243	35.27	343	151.58
−56	1.8296	3.1922	44	91.0757	144	4.04	244	35.88	344	153.48
−55	2.0833	3.5993	45	95.8984	145	4.16	245	36.51	345	155.40
−54	2.3694	4.0535	46	100.939	146	4.27	246	37.14	346	157.34
−53	2.6917	4.5597	47	106.206	147	4.39	247	37.78	347	159.30
−52	3.0542	5.1231	48	111.708	148	4.51	248	38.43	348	161.28
−51	3.4618	5.7496	49	117.452	149	4.64	249	39.09	349	163.27
−50	3.9193	6.4454	50	123.4478	150	4.76	250	39.76	350	165.29
−49	4.4324	7.2174	51	129.7042	151	4.89	251	40.44	351	167.33
−48	5.0073	8.0729	52	136.2304	152	5.02	252	41.12	352	169.39
−47	5.6506	9.0201	53	143.0357	153	5.16	253	41.81	353	171.47
−46	6.3699	10.068	54	150.1298	154	5.29	254	42.52	354	173.58
−45	7.1732	11.225	55	157.5226	155	5.43	255	43.23	355	175.70
−44	8.0695	12.503	56	165.2243	156	5.58	256	43.95	356	177.85
−43	9.0685	13.911	57	173.2451	157	5.72	257	44.68	357	180.02
−42	10.181	15.463	58	181.5959	158	5.87	258	45.42	358	182.21
−41	11.419	17.170	59	190.2874	159	6.03	259	46.16	359	184.43
−40	12.794	19.048	60	199.3309	160	6.18	260	46.92	360	186.66
−39	14.321	21.110	61	208.7378	161	6.34	261	47.69	361	188.93
−38	16.016	23.372	62	218.5198	162	6.50	262	48.46	362	191.21
−37	17.893	25.853	63	228.6888	163	6.67	263	49.25	363	193.52
−36	19.973	28.570	64	239.2572	164	6.84	264	50.05	364	195.86
−35	22.273	31.544	65	250.2373	165	7.01	265	50.85	365	198.22
−34	24.816	34.795	66	261.6421	166	7.18	266	51.67	366	200.61
−33	27.624	38.347	67	273.4845	167	7.36	267	52.49	367	203.02
−32	30.723	42.225	68	285.7781	168	7.55	268	53.33	368	205.47
−31	34.140	46.453	69	298.5363	169	7.73	269	54.17	369	207.93
−30	37.903	51.060	70	311.7731	170	7.92	270	55.03	370	210.43
−29	42.046	56.077	71	325.5029	171	8.11	271	55.89	371	212.96
−28	46.601	61.534	72	339.7401	172	8.31	272	56.77	372	215.53
−27	51.607	67.466	73	354.4995	173	8.51	273	57.66	373	218.13
−26	57.104	73.909	74	369.7963	174	8.72	274	58.56	374	220.64
−25	63.134	80.902	75	385.6459	175	8.92	275	59.46	374.15	221.20
−24	69.745	88.485	76	402.0641	176	9.14	276	60.38
−23	76.987	96.701	77	419.0669	177	9.35	277	61.31
−22	84.914	105.60	78	436.6708	178	9.57	278	62.25
−21	93.584	115.22	79	454.8923	179	9.80	279	63.20
−20	103.06	125.63	80	473.7485	180	10.03	280	64.17
−19	113.41	136.88	81	493.2567	181	10.26	281	65.14
−18	124.70	149.01	82	513.4345	182	10.50	282	66.12
−17	137.02	162.11	83	534.3000	183	10.74	283	67.12
−16	150.44	176.23	84	555.8714	184	10.98	284	68.13
−15	165.06	191.44	85	578.1673	185	11.23	285	69.15
−14	180.97	207.81	86	601.2068	186	11.49	286	70.18
−13	198.27	225.43	87	625.0090	187	11.75	287	71.22
−12	217.07	244.37	88	649.5936	188	12.01	288	72.27
−11	237.49	264.72	89	674.9806	189	12.28	289	73.34
−10	259.66	286.57	90	701.1904	190	12.55	290	74.42
−9	283.69	310.02	91	728.2434	191	12.83	291	75.51
−8	309.75	335.16	92	756.1608	192	13.11	292	76.61
−7	337.97	362.10	93	784.9639	193	13.40	293	77.72
−6	368.52	390.95	94	814.6743	194	13.69	294	78.85
−5	401.58	421.84	95	845.3141	195	13.99	295	79.99
−4	437.31	454.88	96	876.9057	196	14.29	296	81.14
−3	475.92	490.19	97	909.4718	197	14.60	297	82.31
−2	517.62	527.93	98	943.0355	198	14.91	298	83.48
−1	562.62	568.22	99	977.6203	199	15.22	299	84.67
0	611.153	611.213	100	1013.25	200	15.55	300	85.88
Temp. T in °C	P_{i}(T) over ice in Pa	P_{w}(T) over water in Pa	Temp. T in °C	P_{w}(T) over water in hPa	Temp. T in °C	P(T) in bar	Temp. T in °C	P(T) in bar	Temp. T in °C	P(T) in bar

== Magnetic susceptibility ==
Accepted standardized value of the magnetic susceptibility of water at 20 °C (room temperature) is −12.97 cm^{3}/mol.

Accepted standardized value of the magnetic susceptibility of water at 20 °C (room temperature) is −0.702 cm^{3}/g.

Magnetic susceptibility of water at different temperatures
Isotopolog, state	Temperature in K	Magnetic susceptibility in cm^{3}/mol
H_{2}O_{(g)}	>373	−13.1
H_{2}O_{(l)}	373	−13.09
H_{2}O_{(l)}	293	−12.97
H_{2}O_{(l)}	273	−12.93
H_{2}O_{(s)}	273	−12.65
H_{2}O_{(s)}	223	−12.31
DHO_{(l)}	302	−12.97
D_{2}O_{(l)}	293	−12.76
D_{2}O_{(l)}	276.8	−12.66
D_{2}O_{(s)}	276.8	−12.54
D_{2}O_{(s)}	213	−12.41

This box:
- Except where noted otherwise, data relate to Standard temperature and pressure.
- Reliability of data general note.

== See also ==
- Properties of water

== Bibliography ==
- Dean, John Aurie; Lange, Norbert Adolph (1999). Lange's Handbook of Chemistry (15th ed.). McGraw-Hill. ISBN 978-0-07-016384-3.
- Franks, Felix (2012). The Physics and Physical Chemistry of Water. Springer. ISBN 978-1-4684-8334-5.
- Linstrom, Peter J.; Mallard, William G. (eds.). NIST Chemistry WebBook. NIST Standard Reference Database Number 69. Gaithersburg, MD: National Institute of Standards and Technology. doi:10.18434/T4D303.
- Lide, David R. (2004). CRC Handbook of Chemistry and Physics (85th ed.). CRC Press. ISBN 978-0-8493-0485-9.
