= Water dimer =

Two water molecules held together by a hydrogen bond; the simplest water cluster

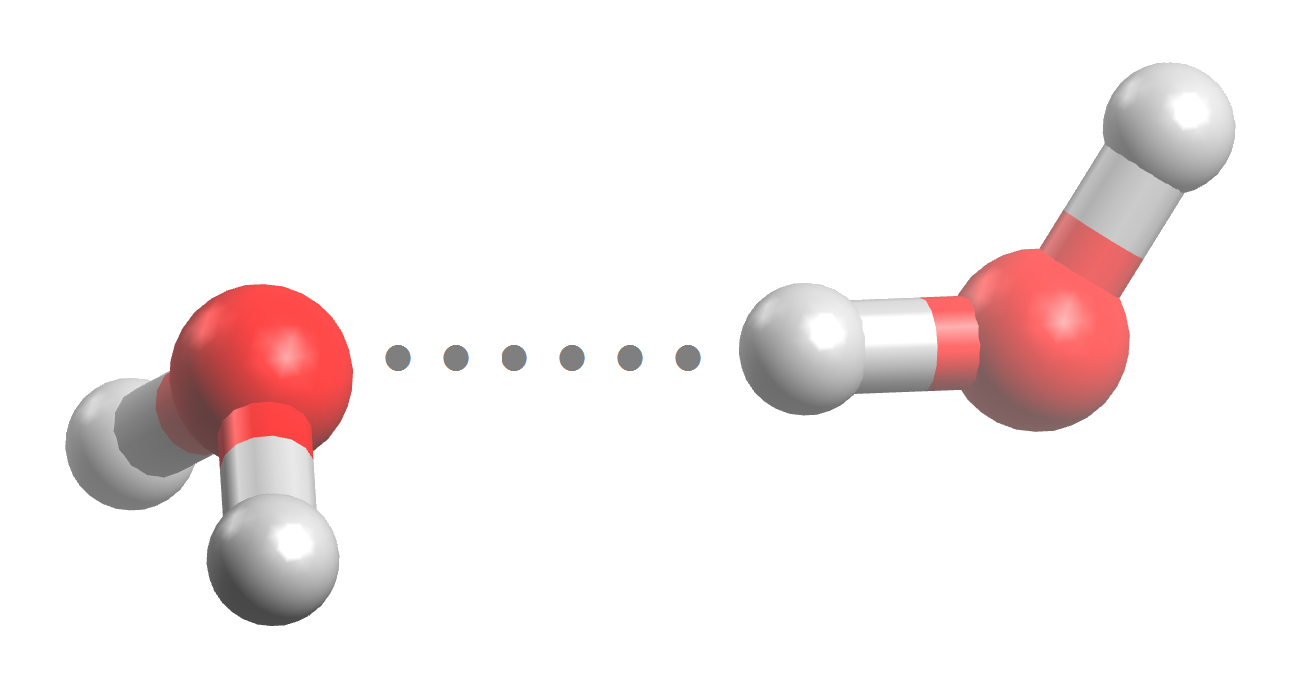
Ball-and-stick model of the linear water dimer

The water dimer consists of two water molecules loosely bound by a hydrogen bond. It is the smallest water cluster. Because it is the simplest model system for studying hydrogen bonding in water, it has been the target of many theoretical (and later experimental) studies that it has been called a "theoretical Guinea pig".

== Structure and properties ==
The ab initio binding energy between the two water molecules is estimated to be 5-6 kcal/mol, although values between 3 and 8 have been obtained depending on the method. The experimentally measured dissociation energy (including nuclear quantum effects) of (H_{2}O)_{2} and (D_{2}O)_{2} are 3.16 ± 0.03 kcal/mol (13.22 ± 0.12 kJ/mol) and 3.56 ± 0.03 kcal/mol (14.88 ± 0.12 kJ/mol), respectively. The values are in excellent agreement with calculations. The O-O distance of the vibrational ground-state is experimentally measured at ca. 2.98 Å; the hydrogen bond is almost linear, but the angle with the plane of the acceptor molecule is about 57°. The vibrational ground-state is known as the linear water dimer (shown in the figure to the right), which is a near prolate top (viz., in terms of rotational constants, A > B ≈ C). Other configurations of interest include the cyclic dimer and the bifurcated dimer.

== History and relevance ==
The first theoretical study of the water dimer was an ab initio calculation published in 1968 by Morokuma and Pedersen. Since then, the water dimer has been the focus of sustained interest by theoretical chemists concerned with hydrogen bonding—a search of the CAS database up to 2006 returns over 1100 related references (73 of them in 2005). In addition to serving as a model for hydrogen bonding, (H_{2}O)_{2} is thought to play a significant role in many atmospheric processes, including chemical reactions, condensation, and solar energy absorption by the atmosphere. In addition, a complete understanding of the water dimer is thought to play a key role in a more thorough understanding of hydrogen bonding in liquid and solid forms of water.
