= Hydrate =

Substance containing water or its constituent elements

In chemistry, a hydrate is a substance that contains water or its constituent elements. The chemical state of the water varies widely between different classes of hydrates, some of which were so labeled before their chemical structure was understood.

== Chemical nature ==
=== Inorganic chemistry ===
Hydrates are inorganic salts "containing water molecules combined in a definite ratio as an integral part of the crystal" that are either bound to a metal center or that have crystallized with the metal complex. Such hydrates are also said to contain water of crystallization or water of hydration. If the water is heavy water in which the constituent hydrogen is the isotope deuterium, then the term deuterate may be used in place of hydrate.

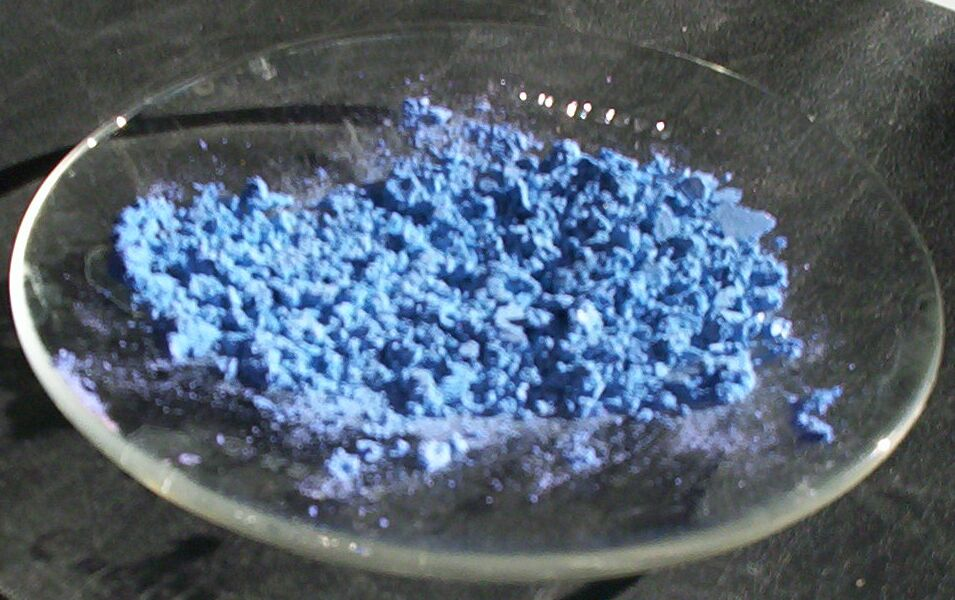
Anhydrous cobalt(II) chloride CoCl_{2} (blue)

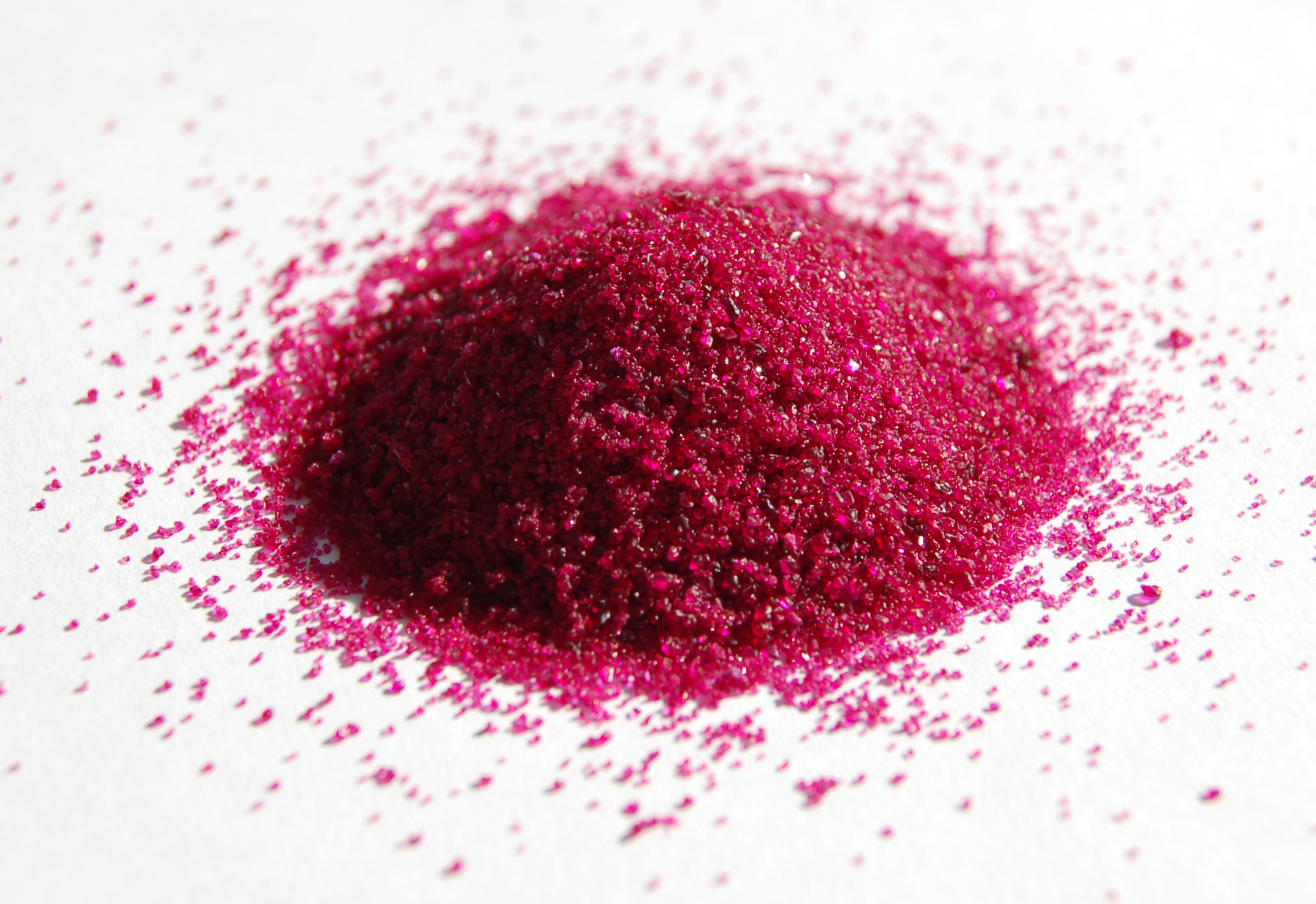
Cobalt(II) chloride hexahydrate CoCl_{2}·6H_{2}O (pink)

A colorful example is cobalt(II) chloride, which turns from blue to red upon hydration, and can therefore be used as a water indicator.

The notation "hydrated compound⋅nH_{2}O", where n is the number of water molecules per formula unit of the salt, is commonly used to show that a salt is hydrated. The n is usually a low integer, though it is possible for fractional values to occur. For example, in a monohydrate n = 1, and in a hexahydrate n = 6. Numerical prefixes mostly of Greek origin are:

- Hemi – 0.5
- Mono – 1
- Sesqui – 1.5
- Di – 2
- Tri – 3
- Tetra – 4
- Penta – 5
- Hexa – 6
- Hepta – 7
- Octa – 8
- Nona – 9
- Deca – 10
- Undeca – 11
- Dodeca – 12
- Trideca – 13
- Tetradeca – 14

A hydrate that has lost water is referred to as an anhydride; the remaining water, if any exists, can only be removed with very strong heating. A substance that does not contain any water is referred to as anhydrous. Some anhydrous compounds are hydrated so easily that they are said to be hygroscopic and are used as drying agents or desiccants.

=== Organic chemistry ===
In organic chemistry, a hydrate is a compound formed by the hydration, i.e. "Addition of water or of the elements of water (i.e. H and OH) to a molecular entity". For example: ethanol, CH_{3}−CH_{2}−OH, is the product of the hydration reaction of ethene, CH_{2}=CH_{2}, formed by the addition of H to one C and OH to the other C, and so can be considered as the hydrate of ethene. A molecule of water may be eliminated, for example, by the action of sulfuric acid. Another example is chloral hydrate, CCl_{3}−CH(OH)_{2}, which can be formed by reaction of water with chloral, CCl_{3}−CH=O.

Many organic molecules, as well as inorganic molecules, form crystals that incorporate water into the crystalline structure without chemical alteration of the organic molecule (water of crystallization). The sugar trehalose, for example, exists in both an anhydrous form (melting point 203 °C) and as a dihydrate (melting point 97 °C). Protein crystals commonly have as much as 50% water content.

Molecules are also labeled as hydrates for historical reasons not covered above. Glucose, C_{6}H_{12}O_{6}, was originally thought of as C_{6}(H_{2}O)_{6} and described as a carbohydrate.

Hydrate formation is common for active ingredients. Many manufacturing processes provide an opportunity for hydrates to form and the state of hydration can be changed with environmental humidity and time. The state of hydration of an active pharmaceutical ingredient can significantly affect the solubility and dissolution rate and therefore its bioavailability.

=== Clathrate hydrates ===
Clathrate hydrates (also known as gas hydrates, gas clathrates, etc.) are water ice with gas molecules trapped within; they are a form of clathrate. Nonpolar molecules can form clathrate hydrates with water, especially under high pressure. An important example is methane hydrate (also known as gas hydrate, methane clathrate, etc.). In addition to methane, gases known to form clathrate hydrates include hydrogen, nitrogen, oxygen, carbon dioxide, and the noble gases argon, krypton, and xenon.

Although there is no hydrogen bonding between water and guest molecules when methane is the guest molecule of the clathrate, guest–host hydrogen bonding often forms when the guest is a larger organic molecule such as tetrahydrofuran. In such cases, the guest–host hydrogen bonds result in the formation of L-type Bjerrum defects in the clathrate lattice.

== Stability ==
The stability of hydrates is generally determined by the nature of the compounds, their temperature, and the relative humidity (if they are exposed to air).

== See also ==
- Efflorescence
- Hygroscopy
- Mineral hydration
- Water of crystallization
- Hemihydrate
- Hydrous oxide
