= Filled ice =

Filled ice is a class of clathrate compound in which small guest molecules occupy voids within a water-ice lattice that closely resembles one of the crystalline phases of pure ice, rather than the discrete polyhedral cages characteristic of conventional clathrate hydrates. Filled ices typically form at pressures of roughly 1–2 GPa and above, when the open cage structures of low-pressure clathrates collapse under compression and reorganize into a denser, ice-like host framework.

== Structure and formation ==
Unlike clathrate hydrates, in which guest molecules are isolated within closed water cages, filled ices host guest molecules within open channels or interstitial voids of a distorted ice lattice. Several low-pressure ice polymorphs have been found to host guest species in this way, most commonly ice II and cubic ice I_{c}, as well as hexagonal ice I_{h} at higher pressure. The inclusion of guest molecules can stabilize these otherwise metastable ice frameworks to much higher pressures and temperatures than the pure ice phase would tolerate on its own.

Filled ice structures have been observed for a number of small guest species, including helium (ice II-based), hydrogen (ice II- and ice I_{c}-based, with a further high-density ice I_{c}-based phase, C_{3}, observed up to at least 90 GPa), methane (an ice I_{h}-based structure known as methane hydrate III, followed by a denser ice I_{h}-based phase, MH-IV, stable to at least 150 GPa), argon, nitrogen, and oxygen (which forms a filled ice isostructural with methane hydrate III before decomposing at a comparatively low 2.6 GPa). Decomposition pressures vary considerably between guest species: hydrogen- and methane-filled ices remain stable to at least 90 and 150 GPa respectively, whereas oxygen-filled ice decomposes into ice and free oxygen above 2.6 GPa, an unusually low limit attributed to the small molecular volume of compressed fluid oxygen relative to other guests.

Ionic species can also be incorporated into high-pressure ice frameworks in a structurally analogous way, forming so-called salt-filled ices such as lithium chloride- and sodium chloride-doped ice VII, although these are thought to form by a distinct crystallization pathway from amorphous precursors rather than by direct compression of a clathrate phase.

== Planetary relevance ==
Because filled ices can remain stable to pressures and temperatures relevant to the deep interiors of icy moons and giant planets, they have been proposed as a means by which large quantities of volatile gases such as hydrogen, methane, and oxygen could be stored within planetary ices far beyond the depths accessible to conventional low-pressure clathrates. The stability of oxygen-filled ice to at least 2.6 GPa, for example, is thought to allow radiolytically produced oxygen to penetrate into the ice shells of moons such as Europa and Ganymede, both above and below any subsurface liquid-water ocean.

== See also ==
- Clathrate hydrate
- Clathrate compound
- Methane clathrate
- Hydrogen clathrate
- Oxygen clathrate
- Nitrogen clathrate
- Carbon dioxide clathrate
- Ice
