= Oxygen clathrate =

Oxygen clathrate or oxygen hydrate is a clathrate hydrate consisting of a water-ice framework with regular crystalline cavities that contain oxygen (O_{2}) molecules. It has been proposed to occur naturally in the surface and near-surface ices of oxygen-atmosphere icy moons such as Europa and Ganymede, where the oxygen is thought to originate from radiolysis of water ice by charged particles.

== Structure ==
At low pressure, oxygen clathrate adopts the cubic CS-II (also called sII) clathrate structure, with two distinct cage types: 16 smaller dodecahedral (12-faced) cages and 8 larger hexakaidecahedral (16-faced) cages per unit cell, first characterized by neutron powder diffraction. As with hydrogen clathrate, multiple oxygen molecules can occupy the larger cage, with occupancy increasing from about 1 O_{2} per large cage at low pressure to as many as 2.8 O_{2} per cage near 1.4 GPa.

Under pressure at room temperature, oxygen clathrate undergoes a sequence of structural transformations before decomposing into ice and free oxygen:

- CS-II clathrate (stable from ambient pressure to about 1.0 GPa)
- a tetragonal ST clathrate structure (about 1.0–1.2 GPa), also observed in the argon–water and nitrogen–water systems
- a chiral C_{0} hydrate structure (about 1.2–1.6 GPa), in which oxygen occupies open channels in a water network unrelated to any stable ice phase, also seen in the hydrogen–water and carbon dioxide–water systems
- a filled ice phase isostructural with methane hydrate III (about 1.6–2.6 GPa), in which oxygen occupies channels within a water framework resembling ice I_{h}

Above 2.6 GPa at room temperature, this filled-ice phase decomposes into separate oxygen and ice VII. This decomposition pressure is low compared to other filled-ice gas hydrates: hydrogen-filled ice remains stable to at least 90 GPa and methane-filled ice to at least 150 GPa.

At low temperature (66 K), representative of icy-moon surface conditions, the CS-II clathrate remains stable up to about 1.4 GPa, above which the host lattice undergoes pressure-induced amorphization rather than a further ordered structural transition.

== Occurrence and planetary relevance ==
Oxygen has been detected spectroscopically on the surface of Ganymede, where it is thought to be held largely as a low-pressure clathrate, and oxygen clathrates have been proposed as a component of subsurface ices on Europa. Because oxygen hydrate is stable to at least 2.6 GPa, it can in principle penetrate to depths within icy moons both above and below any subsurface liquid-water ocean.

Oxygen and hydrogen clathrates share structural similarities, both forming CS-II and C_{0} phases with multiple guest occupancy of the larger cage. Since both O_{2} and H_{2} are produced together by radiolysis of water ice, their preferential retention in close proximity within a shared host lattice has been proposed as a mechanism for enhanced recombination back into water, offering a possible explanation for the discrepancy between modelled and measured rates of oxygen production on Europa.

== See also ==
- Filled ice
- Hydrogen clathrate
- Nitrogen clathrate
- Methane clathrate
- Clathrate hydrate
- Europa (moon)
