= Nitrogen clathrate =

Nitrogen clathrate or nitrogen hydrate is a clathrate consisting of ice with regular crystalline cavities that contain nitrogen molecules. Nitrogen clathrate is a variety of air hydrates. It occurs naturally in ice caps on Earth, and is believed to be important in the outer Solar System on moons such as Titan and Triton which have a cold nitrogen atmosphere.

== Properties ==
Nitrogen clathrate hydrate has a density range of 0.95 to 1.00 gcm^{−3} varying depending on how full of the nitrogen the cavities are. So it may float or sink in water. Thermal conductivity is 0.5 Wm^{−1}K^{−1} which is about a quarter that of ice. The linear thermal expansion, and heat capacity are similar to that of ice. The clathrate is much more resistant to shear stresses than pure water ice, yet the Young's modulus is about the same.

At 0.6 °C a pressure of at least 171.3 bars is required to start forming nitrogen clathrate in water. At -29.1 °C, the pressure required reduces to 71.5 bars.

Additional molecules can allow a mixed nitrogen clathrate to form at lower pressures. For example, carbon disulfide only needs a third the pressure, and with cyclohexane only a quarter pressure is required.

The Raman spectrum of nitrogen clathrate shows a N-N stretching frequency at 2322.4 cm^{−1}, this is smaller than for nitrogen dissolved in water (2325.0 cm^{−1}) and gaseous nitrogen (2327.7 cm^{−1}). It has an O-H stretching vibration at 3092.1 cm^{−1}, which compares to 3125.3 cm^{−1} in ice.

== Structure ==
The lowest pressure structure of nitrogen clathrate is called clathrate structure-II or CS-II. It is a cubic crystal structure with a unit cell edge of 17.3 Å. The clathrate has two kinds of cavity that can contain the guest nitrogen molecules. Each unit cell has eight large and 16 small cavities along with 136 water molecules. The large cavity has twelve pentagonal faces, and four hexagonal faces with a cavity radius of 4.73 Å. It is called the hexadecahedral cavity. The symbol for these cavities is 5^{12}6^{4}. The small pentagondodecahedral cavities have twelve pentagon shaped faces and a radius of 3.91 Å. These cavities have a symbol of 5^{12} The large cavities can contain two nitrogen molecules and the small cavities can contain one molecule. The disassociation pressure of nitrogen increases with increasing temperature. At 300K the nitrogen pressure is 2.06 kbar and at 285.6K the pressure is 0.55 kbar.

There are four different nitrogen clathrate phases depending on pressure. At higher pressures the CS-II phase changes to a hexagonal structure termed SH. The SH unit cell contains 34 water molecules, 20 small cavities (5^{12}), 20 medium cavities (4^{3}5^{6}6^{3}) and 36 large cavities (5^{12}6^{8}). At still higher pressures a tetragonal form (termed ST) (4^{2}5^{8}6^{4}) exists. At even higher pressures a phase called a filled ice structure (FIS) is formed. This has alternate layers of water and nitrogen molecules.

The quadruple points in the phase diagram are where nitrogen gas, water or ice, and two different solid phases of clathrate are in equilibrium. One quadruple point is at 143 bars and −1.3 °C where ice, clathrate hydrate, water and nitrogen gas are all present. At 6,500 bars and 41.5 °C there are two different clathrates, the low pressure hydrate, and hydrate-1. At 12,500 bars and 46.5° hydrate-1 and −2 are in equilibrium, and at 15,250 bars and 52.5° above which there is no liquid water, but rather ice 6.

== Production ==
Nitrogen hydrate clathrate can be made by applying high pressures to nitrogen gas on water. Crystals can take weeks to grow. Another way to produce it, without using applied pressure, is to first make amorphous solid water by condensing water vapour at 77 K. This absorbs nitrogen gas at a pressure of 1 atmosphere. When the temperature is raised to 113K the amorphous phase changes to a crystalline form, and trapped nitrogen converts some ice into a clathrate.

== Applications ==
One way to perform carbon capture from combustion products is to compress it with water to try to form a carbon dioxide clathrate. Since the air for burning also contains nitrogen, the fumes from combustion contain mostly nitrogen, and so nitrogen clathrate formation also comes into effect. A pressure of 77 bars is required to start forming clathrate from 17% carbon dioxide – 83% nitrogen mix at 0.6 °C. The clathrate formed contains much more carbon dioxide than nitrogen, and so can separate out carbon dioxide to leave behind nitrogen. Using tetrahydrofuran at 1 molar concentration allows a mixed THF-carbon dioxide-nitrogen clathrate to form at much lower pressures (3.45 bars), but much less gas is consumed and it is much slower.

Nitrogen clathrate has been studied as a route to achieving a low pressure hydrogen clathrate for hydrogen storage. Forming hydrogen clathrate hydrate requires very high pressures, but by starting with nitrogen clathrate, multiple hydrogen molecules can substitute for nitrogen in the large cavities. However this is inefficient, also yielding a lot of ice.

== Occurrence ==
On the Earth nitrogen clathrate is found in ice caps at a depth of 1000 m or more. Air bubbles that have been trapped are pressurised at this depth to 100 bars, and the nitrogen can combine with the cold ice to form a clathrate; however, this can be contaminated with dioxygen, forming an air clathrate.

On the Saturnian moon Titan, nitrogen clathrate is predicted to be stable and exist along with ice on the surface, and deeper into the crust. It may also exist as a solid layer beneath the interior ocean. Nitrogen is the predominant component of the atmosphere. The clathrate may serve as a reservoir for nitrogen, and clathrates may also store methane, hydrogen sulfide, krypton and xenon. Clathrates formed at −178 °C are predicted to be predominantly nitrogen clathrate, with a smaller proportion of methane clathrate. Propane and ethane only form minute constituents.

In the protosolar nebula, nitrogen clathrate is predicted to condense in a significant amount of about one percent, at temperatures below 45 K. However carbon dioxide and carbon monoxide clathrate is expected to be more common. This would affect the composition of comets. In the gases coming out of comet 67P/Churyumov–Gerasimenko the ROSINA instrument on the Rosetta detected molecular nitrogen. N_{2} coming out of the comet could result from decomposing nitrogen clathrate or nitrogen trapped in amorphous ice. The ratio to carbon monoxide (30 times more CO) suggests that the comet condensed at a temperature of 30 K.

On Mars the nitrogen pressure is far too low to produce nitrogen clathrate itself, but nitrogen likely makes up a small fraction of carbon dioxide clathrate which condenses at the poles. At 138 K it is predicted to make up 0.015% and at 161 K 0.032%. This proportion is smaller than that of argon, which is four times more abundant in the clathrate. 99.8% or more of the clathrate gas is carbon dioxide.
