= Triple point =

Thermodynamic point where three matter phases exist

A typical phase diagram (with a linear scale for the pressure on the y-axis; not a logarithmic scale; the temperature scale on the x-axis is always linear). The solid green line applies to most substances; the dashed green line gives the anomalous behavior of water

In thermodynamics, the triple point of a substance is the temperature and pressure at which the three phases (gas, liquid, and solid) of that substance coexist in thermodynamic equilibrium. It is that temperature and pressure at which the sublimation, fusion, and vapourisation curves meet. For example, the triple point of mercury occurs at a temperature of −38.8 °C (−37.8 °F) and a pressure of 0.165 mPa.

In addition to the triple point for the solid, liquid, and gas phases, a triple point may involve more than one solid phase in substances with multiple polymorphs. Helium-4 is unusual in that it has no sublimation/deposition curve and therefore no triple points where its solid phase meets its gas phase. Instead, it has a vapor-liquid-superfluid point, a solid-liquid-superfluid point, a solid-solid-liquid point, and a solid-solid-superfluid point. None of these should be confused with the lambda point, which is not any kind of triple point.

The first mention of the term "triple point" was on August 3, 1871, by James Thomson, brother of Lord Kelvin. The triple points of several substances are used to define points in the ITS-90 international temperature scale, ranging from the triple point of hydrogen (13.8033 K) to the triple point of water (273.16 K, 0.01 °C, or 32.018 °F).

Before 2019, the triple point of water was used to define the kelvin, the base unit of thermodynamic temperature in the International System of Units (SI). The kelvin was defined so that the triple point of water is exactly 273.16 K, but that changed with the 2019 revision of the SI, where the kelvin was redefined so that the Boltzmann constant is exactly 1.380649×10^{−23} J⋅K^{−1}, and the triple point of water became an experimentally measured constant.

== Triple point of water ==
=== Gas–liquid–solid triple point ===
Water boiling at 0°C using a vacuum pump.

Following the 2019 revision of the SI, the value of the triple point of water is no longer used as a defining point. However, its empirical value remains important: the unique combination of pressure and temperature at which liquid water, solid ice, and water vapour coexist in a stable equilibrium is approximately 273.16±0.0001 K and a vapour pressure of 611.657 pascals (6.11657 mbar; 0.00603659 atm).

Liquid water can only exist at pressures equal to or greater than the triple point. Below this, in the vacuum of outer space, solid ice sublimates, transitioning directly into water vapor when heated at a constant pressure. Conversely, at pressure above the triple point, solid ice upon heating first melts into liquid water at constant temperature, then evaporates or boils to form vapor at a higher temperature.

For most substances, the gas–liquid–solid triple point is the minimum temperature where the liquid can exist. For water, this is not the case. The melting point of ordinary ice decreases with pressure, as shown by the phase diagram's dashed green line. Just below the triple point, compression at a constant temperature transforms water vapor first to solid and then to liquid.

Historically, during the Mariner 9 mission to Mars, the triple point pressure of water was used to define "sea level". Now, laser altimetry and gravitational measurements are preferred to define Martian elevation.

=== High-pressure phases ===
At high pressures, water has a complex phase diagram with 15 known phases of ice and several triple points, including 10 whose coordinates are shown in the diagram. For example, the triple point at 251 K (−22 °C) and 210 MPa (2070 atm) corresponds to the conditions for the coexistence of ice Ih (ordinary ice), ice III and liquid water, all at equilibrium. There are also triple points for the coexistence of three solid phases, for example ice II, ice V and ice VI at 218 K (−55 °C) and 620 MPa (6120 atm).

For those high-pressure forms of ice which can exist in equilibrium with liquid, the diagram shows that melting points increase with pressure. At temperatures above 273 K (0 °C), increasing the pressure on water vapor results first in liquid water and then a high-pressure form of ice. In the range 251–273 K, ice I is formed first, followed by liquid water and then ice III or ice V, followed by other still denser high-pressure forms.

Phase diagram of water including high-pressure forms ice II, ice III, etc. The pressure axis is logarithmic. For detailed descriptions of these phases, see Ice.

The various triple points of water
Phases in stable equilibrium	Pressure	Temperature
liquid water, ice I_{h}, and water vapor	611.657 Pa	273.16 K (0.0001 °C)
liquid water, ice I_{h}, and ice III	209.9 MPa	251 K (−22 °C)
liquid water, ice III, and ice V	350.1 MPa	−17.0 °C
liquid water, ice V, and ice VI	632.4 MPa	0.16 °C
ice I_{h}, Ice II, and ice III	213 MPa	−35 °C
ice II, ice III, and ice V	344 MPa	−24 °C
ice II, ice V, and ice VI	626 MPa	−70 °C

== Triple-point cells ==
Triple-point cells are used in the calibration of thermometers. For exacting work, triple-point cells are typically filled with a highly pure chemical substance such as hydrogen, argon, mercury, or water (depending on the desired temperature). The purity of these substances can be such that only one part in a million is a contaminant, called "six nines" because it is 99.9999% pure. A specific isotopic composition (for water, VSMOW) is used because variations in isotopic composition cause small changes in the triple point. Triple-point cells are so effective at achieving highly precise, reproducible temperatures, that an international calibration standard for thermometers called ITS–90 relies upon triple-point cells of hydrogen, neon, oxygen, argon, mercury, and water for delineating six of its defined temperature points.

== Table of triple points ==
This table lists the gas–liquid–solid triple points of several substances. Unless otherwise noted, the data come from the U.S. National Bureau of Standards (now NIST, National Institute of Standards and Technology).

Substance	T [K] (°C)	p [kPa]* (atm)
Acetylene	192.4 K (−80.7 °C)	120 kPa (1.2 atm)
Ammonia	195.40 K (−77.75 °C)	6.060 kPa (0.05981 atm)
Argon	83.8058 K (−189.3442 °C)	68.9 kPa (0.680 atm)
Arsenic	1,090 K (820 °C)	3,628 kPa (35.81 atm)
Butane	134.6 K (−138.6 °C)	7×10^{−4} kPa (6.9×10^{−6} atm)
Carbon (graphite)	4,765 K (4,492 °C)	10,132 kPa (100.00 atm)
Carbon dioxide	216.55 K (−56.60 °C)	517 kPa (5.10 atm)
Carbon monoxide	68.10 K (−205.05 °C)	15.37 kPa (0.1517 atm)
Chloroform	209.61 K (−63.54 °C)	?
Deuterium	18.63 K (−254.52 °C)	17.1 kPa (0.169 atm)
Ethane	89.89 K (−183.26 °C)	1.1×10^{−3} kPa (1.1×10^{−5} atm)
Ethanol	150 K (−123 °C)	4.3×10^{−7} kPa (4.2×10^{−9} atm)
Ethylene	104.0 K (−169.2 °C)	0.12 kPa (0.0012 atm)
Formic acid	281.40 K (8.25 °C)	2.2 kPa (0.022 atm)
Helium-4 (vapor−He-I−He-II)	2.1768 K (−270.9732 °C)	5.048 kPa (0.04982 atm)
Helium-4 (hcp−bcc−He-II)	1.463 K (−271.687 °C)	26.036 kPa (0.25696 atm)
Helium-4 (bcc−He-I−He-II)	1.762 K (−271.388 °C)	29.725 kPa (0.29336 atm)
Helium-4 (hcp−bcc−He-I)	1.772 K (−271.378 °C)	30.016 kPa (0.29623 atm)
Hexafluoroethane	173.08 K (−100.07 °C)	26.60 kPa (0.2625 atm)
Hydrogen	13.8033 K (−259.3467 °C)	7.04 kPa (0.0695 atm)
Hydrogen-1 (Protium)	13.96 K (−259.19 °C)	7.18 kPa (0.0709 atm)
Hydrogen chloride	158.96 K (−114.19 °C)	13.9 kPa (0.137 atm)
Iodine	386.65 K (113.50 °C)	12.07 kPa (0.1191 atm)
Isobutane	113.55 K (−159.60 °C)	1.9481×10^{−5} kPa (1.9226×10^{−7} atm)
Krypton	115.76 K (−157.39 °C)	74.12 kPa (0.7315 atm)
Mercury	234.3156 K (−38.8344 °C)	1.65×10^{−7} kPa (1.63×10^{−9} atm)
Methane	90.68 K (−182.47 °C)	11.7 kPa (0.115 atm)
Neon	24.5561 K (−248.5939 °C)	43.332 kPa (0.42765 atm)
Nitric oxide	109.50 K (−163.65 °C)	21.92 kPa (0.2163 atm)
Nitrogen	63.18 K (−209.97 °C)	12.6 kPa (0.124 atm)
Nitrous oxide	182.34 K (−90.81 °C)	87.85 kPa (0.8670 atm)
Oxygen	54.3584 K (−218.7916 °C)	0.14625 kPa (0.0014434 atm)
Palladium	1,825 K (1,552 °C)	3.5×10^{−3} kPa (3.5×10^{−5} atm)
Platinum	2,045 K (1,772 °C)	2×10^{−4} kPa (2.0×10^{−6} atm)
Radon	202 K (−71 °C)	70 kPa (0.69 atm)
(mono)Silane	88.48 K (−184.67 °C)	0.019644 kPa (0.00019387 atm)
Sulfur dioxide	197.69 K (−75.46 °C)	1.67 kPa (0.0165 atm)
Titanium	1,941 K (1,668 °C)	5.3×10^{−3} kPa (5.2×10^{−5} atm)
Uranium hexafluoride	337.17 K (64.02 °C)	151.7 kPa (1.497 atm)
Water	273.16 K (0.01 °C)	0.611657 kPa (0.00603659 atm)
Xenon	161.3 K (−111.8 °C)	81.5 kPa (0.804 atm)
Zinc	692.65 K (419.50 °C)	0.065 kPa (0.00064 atm)

Notes:

- For comparison, typical atmospheric pressure is 101.325 kPa (1 atm).
- Before the new definition of SI units, water's triple point, 273.16 K, was an exact number.

== See also ==
- Critical point (thermodynamics)
- Gibbs' phase rule
