= Carbon dioxide clathrate =

Snow-like crystalline substance composed of water ice and carbon dioxide

Carbon dioxide hydrate or carbon dioxide clathrate is a snow-like crystalline substance composed of water ice and carbon dioxide. It normally is a Type I gas clathrate. There has also been some experimental evidence for the development of a metastable Type II phase at a temperature near the ice melting point. The clathrate can exist below 283K (10 °C) at a range of pressures of carbon dioxide. CO_{2} hydrates are widely studied around the world due to their promising prospects of carbon dioxide capture from flue gas and fuel gas streams relevant to post-combustion and pre-combustion capture. It is also quite likely to be important on Mars due to the presence of carbon dioxide and ice at low temperatures.

== History ==
The first evidence for the existence of CO_{2} hydrates dates back to the year 1882, when Zygmunt Florenty Wróblewski reported clathrate formation while studying carbonic acid. He noted that gas hydrate was a white material resembling snow and could be formed by raising the pressure above a certain limit in his H_{2}O - CO_{2} system. He was the first to estimate the CO_{2} hydrate composition, finding it to be approximately CO_{2}•8H_{2}O. He also mentions that "...the hydrate is only formed either on the walls of the tube, where the water layer is extremely thin or on the free water surface... (from French)" This already indicates the importance of the surface available for reaction (i.e. the larger the surface the better). Later on, in 1894, M. P. Villard deduced the hydrate composition as CO_{2}•6H_{2}O. Three years later, he published the hydrate dissociation curve in the range 267 K to 283 K (-6 to 10 °C). Tamman & Krige measured the hydrate decomposition curve from 253 K down to 230 K in 1925 and Frost & Deaton (1946) determined the dissociation pressure between 273 and 283 K (0 and 10 °C). Takenouchi & Kennedy (1965) measured the decomposition curve from 45 bars up to 2 kbar (4.5 to 200 MPa). The CO_{2} hydrate was classified as a Type I clathrate for the first time by von Stackelberg & Muller (1954).

== Importance ==
=== Earth ===
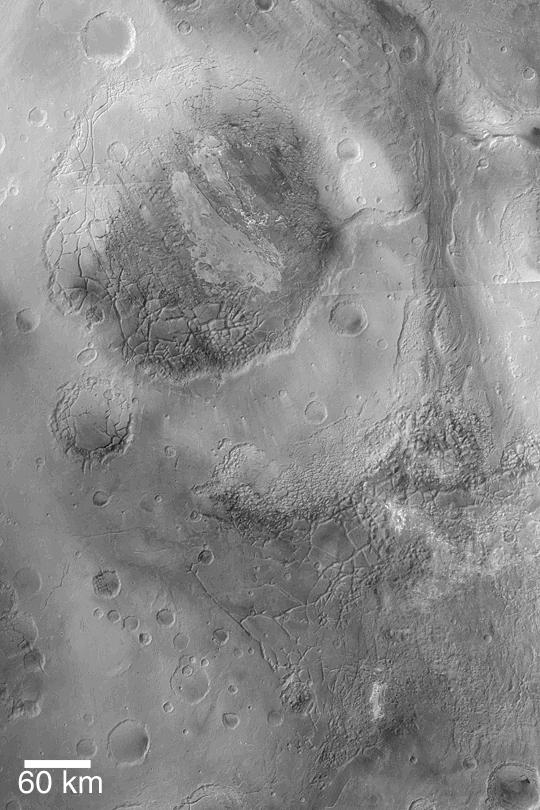
In this mosaic taken by the Mars Global Surveyor: Aram Chaos - top left and Iani Chaos - bottom right. A river-bed-like outflow channel can be seen, originating from Iani Chaos and extending towards the top of the image.

On Earth, CO_{2} hydrate is mostly of academic interest. Tim Collett of the United States Geological Survey (USGS) proposed pumping carbon dioxide into subsurface methane clathrates, thereby releasing the methane and storing the carbon dioxide. As of 2009, ConocoPhillips is working on a trial on the Alaska North Slope with the US Department of Energy to release methane in this way. At first glance, it seems that the thermodynamic conditions there favor the existence of hydrates, yet given that the pressure is created by sea water rather than by CO_{2}, the hydrate will decompose. Recently, Professor Praveen Linga and his group in collaboration with ExxonMobil have demonstrated the first-ever experimental evidence of the stability of carbon dioxide hydrate in deep-oceanic sediments.

=== Mars ===
However, it is believed that CO_{2} clathrate might be of significant importance for planetology. CO_{2} is an abundant volatile on Mars. It dominates in the atmosphere and covers its polar ice caps much of the time. In the early seventies, the possible existence of CO_{2} hydrates on Mars was proposed. Recent consideration of the temperature and pressure of the regolith and of the thermally insulating properties of dry ice and CO_{2} clathrate suggested that dry ice, CO_{2} clathrate, liquid CO_{2}, and carbonated groundwater are common phases, even at Martian temperatures.

If CO_{2} hydrates are present in the Martian polar caps, as some authors suggest, then the polar cap can potentially melt at depth. Melting of the polar cap would not be possible if it was composed entirely of pure water ice (Mellon et al. 1996). This is because of the clathrate's lower thermal conductivity, higher stability under pressure, and higher strength, as compared to pure water ice.

The question of a possible diurnal and annual CO_{2} hydrate cycle on Mars remains, since the large temperature amplitudes observed there cause exiting and reentering the clathrate stability field on a daily and seasonal basis. The question is, then, can gas hydrate being deposited on the surface be detected by any means? The OMEGA spectrometer on board Mars Express returned some data, which were used by the OMEGA team to produce CO_{2} and H_{2}O-based images of the South polar cap. No definitive answer has been rendered with respect to Martian CO_{2} clathrate formation.

The decomposition of CO_{2} hydrate is believed to play a significant role in the terraforming processes on Mars, and many of the observed surface features are partly attributed to it. For instance, Musselwhite et al. (2001) argued that the Martian gullies had been formed not by liquid water but by liquid CO_{2}, since the present Martian climate does not allow liquid water existence on the surface in general. This is especially true in the southern hemisphere, where most of the gully structures occur. However, water can be present there as ice Ih, CO_{2} hydrates or hydrates of other gases. All these can be melted under certain conditions and result in gully formation. There might also be liquid water at depths >2 km under the surface (see geotherms in the phase diagram). It is believed that the melting of ground-ice by high heat fluxes formed the Martian chaotic terrains. Milton (1974) suggested the decomposition of CO_{2} clathrate caused rapid water outflows and formation of chaotic terrains. Cabrol et al. (1998) proposed that the physical environment and the morphology of the south polar domes on Mars suggest possible cryovolcanism. The surveyed region consisted of 1.5 km-thick-layered deposits covered seasonally by CO_{2} frost underlain by H_{2}O ice and CO_{2} hydrate at depths > 10 m. When the pressure and the temperature are raised above the stability limit, clathrate is decomposed into ice and gases, resulting in explosive eruptions.

Still a lot more examples of the possible importance of the CO_{2} hydrate on Mars can be given. One thing remains unclear: is it really possible to form hydrate there? Kieffer (2000) suggests no significant amount of clathrates could exist near the surface of Mars. Stewart & Nimmo (2002) find it is extremely unlikely that CO_{2} clathrate is present in the Martian regolith in quantities that would affect surface modification processes. They argue that long term storage of CO_{2} hydrate in the crust, hypothetically formed in an ancient warmer climate, is limited by the removal rates in the present climate. Baker et al. 1991 suggests that, if not today, at least in the early Martian geologic history the clathrates may have played an important role for the climate changes there. Since not too much is known about the CO_{2} hydrates formation and decomposition kinetics, or their physical and structural properties, it becomes clear that all the above-mentioned speculations rest on extremely unstable bases.

=== Moons ===
On Enceladus decomposition of carbon dioxide clathrate is a possible way to explain the formation of gas plumes.

In Europa (moon), clathrate should be important for storing carbon dioxide. In the conditions of the subsurface ocean in Europa, carbon dioxide clathrate should sink, and therefore not be apparent at the surface.

== Phase diagram ==
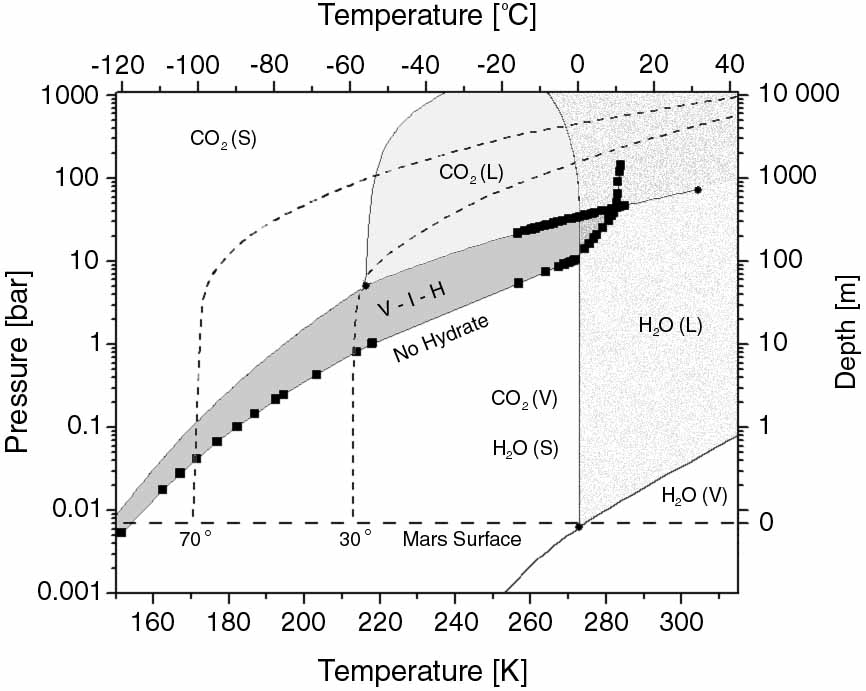
CO_{2} hydrate phase diagram. The black squares show experimental data. The lines of the CO_{2} phase boundaries are calculated according to the Intern. thermodyn. tables (1976). The H_{2}O phase boundaries are only guides to the eye. The abbreviations are as follows: L - liquid, V - vapor, S - solid, I - water ice, H - hydrate.

The hydrate structures are stable at different pressure-temperature conditions depending on the guest molecule. Here is given one Mars-related phase diagram of CO_{2} hydrate, combined with those of pure CO_{2} and water. CO_{2} hydrate has two quadruple points: (I-Lw-H-V) (T = 273.1 K; p = 12.56 bar or 1.256 MPa) and (Lw-H-V-LHC) (T = 283.0 K; p = 44.99 bar or 4.499 MPa). CO_{2} itself has a triple point at T = 216.58 K and p = 5.185 bar (518.5 kPa) and a critical point at T = 304.2 K and p = 73.858 bar (7.3858 MPa). The dark gray region (V-I-H) represents the conditions at which CO_{2} hydrate is stable together with gaseous CO_{2} and water ice (below 273.15 K). On the horizontal axes the temperature is given in kelvins and degrees Celsius (bottom and top respectively). On the vertical ones are given the pressure (left) and the estimated depth in the Martian regolith (right). The horizontal dashed line at zero depth represents the average Martian surface conditions. The two bent dashed lines show two theoretical Martian geotherms after Stewart & Nimmo (2002) at 30° and 70° latitude.
