= Hydrogen clathrate =

A hydrogen clathrate is a clathrate containing hydrogen in a water lattice. This substance is interesting due to its possible use to store hydrogen in a hydrogen economy. A recent review that accounts the state-of-the-art and future prospects and challenges of hydrogen storage as clathrate hydrates is reported by Veluswamy et al. (2014).

An unusual characteristic of hydrogen clathrate is that multiple hydrogen molecules can occur at each cage site in the ice, one of only a very few guest molecule that forms clathrates with this property. The maximum ratio of hydrogen to water is 6 H_{2} to 17 H_{2}O. It can be formed at 250K in a diamond anvil at a pressure of 300 MPa (3000 bar). It takes about 30 minutes to form, so this method is impractical for rapid manufacture. The percent of weight of hydrogen is 3.77%. The cage compartments are hexakaidecahedral and hold from two to four molecules of hydrogen. At temperatures above 160K the molecules rotate around inside the cage. Below 120K the molecules stop racing around the cage, and below 50K are locked into a fixed position. This was determined with deuterium in a neutron scattering experiment.

At higher pressures, hydrogen clathrate transforms into denser "filled ice" phases with progressively higher hydrogen-to-water ratios, including a phase with a water:hydrogen ratio of 1:1 above about 2.3 GPa. This phase crystallises in a cubic structure, where H_{2} and H_{2}O are both arranged in a diamond lattice. It is referred to as the "C2" structure of hydrogen hydrate (for Compound 2) in the academic literature.

Under even higher pressures (over 40 GPa), a cubic structure with a water:hydrogen ratio of 1:2 has been reported: H_{2}O•2H_{2}. This phase is referred to as the "C3" structure of hydrogen hydrate in the academic literature.

Since hydrogen and water ice are common constituents of the universe, it is very likely that under the right circumstances natural hydrogen clathrates will be formed. This could occur in icy moons for example. Hydrogen clathrate was likely to be formed in the high pressure nebulae that formed the gas giants, but not to have formed in comets.

More complex ternary clathrates can occur with hydrogen, water and other molecules such as methane, and tetrahydrofuran.
