= Phases of ice =

States of matter for water as a solid

Log-lin pressure-temperature phase diagram of water. The Roman numerals correspond to some ice phases listed below.

Variations in pressure and temperature give rise to different phases of ice, which have varying properties and molecular geometries. Currently, twenty-two crystalline phases have been observed, including ice I_{h}, I_{c}, ..., XXI. In modern history, phases have been discovered through scientific research with various techniques including pressurization, force application, nucleation agents, and others.

On Earth, most ice is found in the hexagonal Ice I_{h} phase. Less common phases may be found in the atmosphere and underground due to more extreme pressures and temperatures. Some phases are manufactured for nano scale uses due to their properties. In space, amorphous ice is the most common form as confirmed by observation. Thus, it is theorized to be the most common phase in the universe. Various other phases could be found naturally in astronomical objects.

== Theory ==
Most liquids under increased pressure freeze at higher temperatures because the pressure helps to hold the molecules together. However, the strong hydrogen bonds in water make it different: for some pressures higher than 0.10 MPa (1 atm), water freezes at a temperature below 0 °C. Subjected to higher pressures and varying temperatures, ice can form in nineteen separate known crystalline phases. With care, at least fifteen of these phases (one of the known exceptions being ice X) can be recovered at ambient pressure and low temperature in metastable form. The types are differentiated by their crystalline structure, proton ordering, and density. There are also two metastable phases of ice under pressure, both fully hydrogen-disordered; these are Ice IV and Ice XII.

== Crystal structure ==
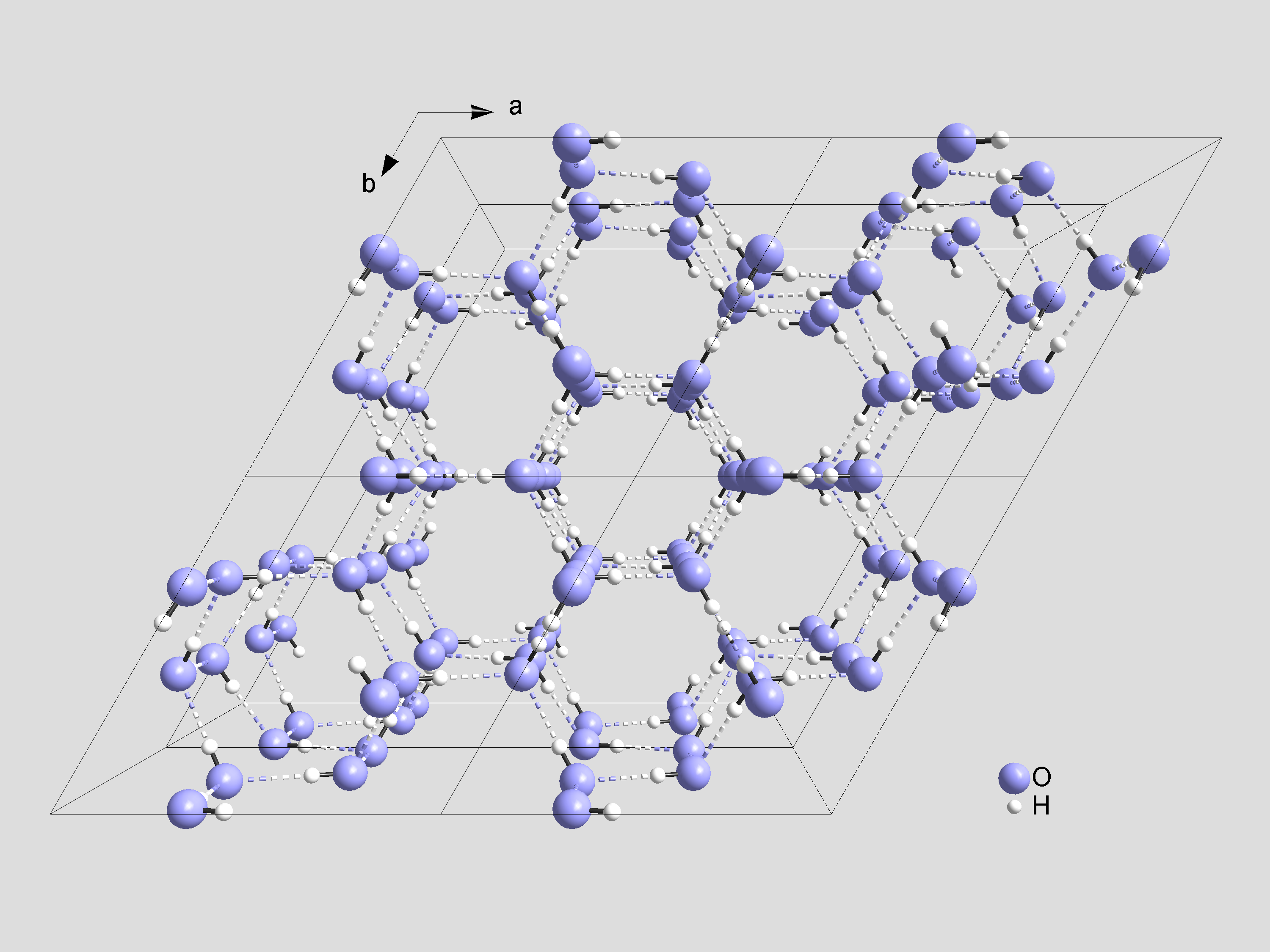
Crystal structure of ice I_{h}. Dashed lines represent hydrogen bonds

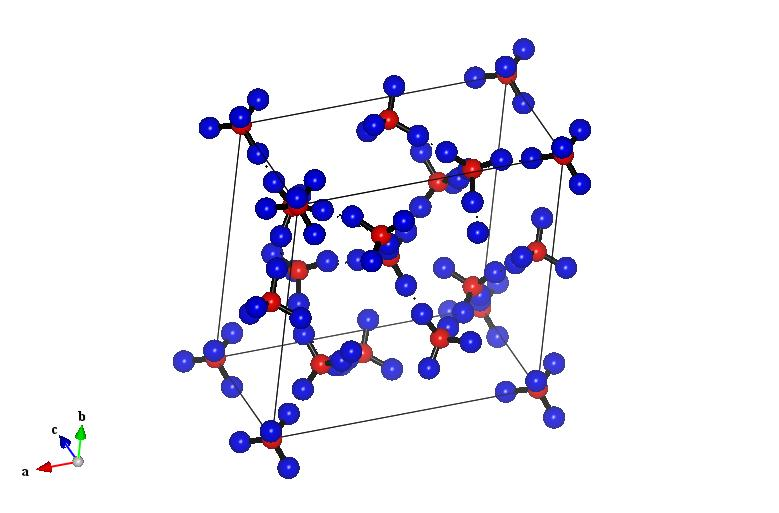
The crystal structure of ice XII

The accepted crystal structure of ordinary ice was first proposed by Linus Pauling in 1935. The structure of ice I_{h} is the wurtzite lattice, roughly one of crinkled planes composed of tessellating hexagonal rings, with an oxygen atom on each vertex, and the edges of the rings formed by hydrogen bonds. The planes alternate in an ABAB pattern, with B planes being reflections of the A planes along the same axes as the planes themselves. The space group is P6_{3}/mmc. The distance between oxygen atoms along each bond is about 275 pm and is the same between any two bonded oxygen atoms in the lattice. The angle between bonds in the crystal lattice is very close to the tetrahedral angle of 109.5°, which is also quite close to the angle between hydrogen atoms in the water molecule (in the gas phase), which is 105°.

This tetrahedral bonding angle of the water molecule essentially accounts for the unusually low density of the crystal lattice – it is beneficial for the lattice to be arranged with tetrahedral angles even though there is an energy penalty in the increased volume of the crystal lattice. As a result, the large hexagonal rings leave almost enough room for another water molecule to exist inside. This gives naturally occurring ice its rare property of being less dense than its liquid form. The tetrahedral-angled hydrogen-bonded hexagonal rings are also the mechanism that causes liquid water to be densest at 4 °C. Close to 0 °C, tiny hexagonal ice I_{h}-like lattices form in liquid water, with greater frequency closer to 0 °C. This effect decreases the density of the water, causing it to be densest at 4 °C when the structures form infrequently.

In the best-known form of ice, ice I_{h}, the crystal structure is characterized by the oxygen atoms forming hexagonal symmetry with near tetrahedral bonding angles. This structure is stable down to −268 °C (5 K; −450 °F), as evidenced by x-ray diffraction and extremely high resolution thermal expansion measurements. Ice I_{h} is also stable under applied pressures of up to about 210 megapascals (2,100 atm) where it transitions into ice III or ice II.

=== Amorphous ice ===
While most forms of ice are crystalline, several amorphous (or "vitreous") forms of ice also exist. Such ice is an amorphous solid form of water, which lacks long-range order in its molecular arrangement. Amorphous ice is produced either by rapid cooling of liquid water to its glass transition temperature (about 136 K or −137 °C) in milliseconds (so the molecules do not have enough time to form a crystal lattice), or by compressing ordinary ice at low temperatures. The most common form on Earth, low-density ice, is usually formed in the laboratory by a slow accumulation of water vapor molecules (physical vapor deposition) onto a very smooth metal crystal surface under 120 K. In outer space it is expected to be formed in a similar manner on a variety of cold substrates, such as dust particles. By contrast, hyperquenched glassy water is formed by spraying a fine mist of water droplets into a liquid such as propane around 80 K, or by hyperquenching fine micrometer-sized droplets on a sample-holder kept at liquid nitrogen temperature, 77 K, in a vacuum. Cooling rates above 10^{4} K/s are required to prevent crystallization of the droplets. At liquid nitrogen temperature, 77 K, hyperquenched glassy water is kinetically stable and can be stored for many years.

Amorphous ices have the property of suppressing long-range density fluctuations and are, therefore, nearly hyperuniform. Classification analysis suggests that low and high density amorphous ices are glasses.

== Pressure-dependent states ==
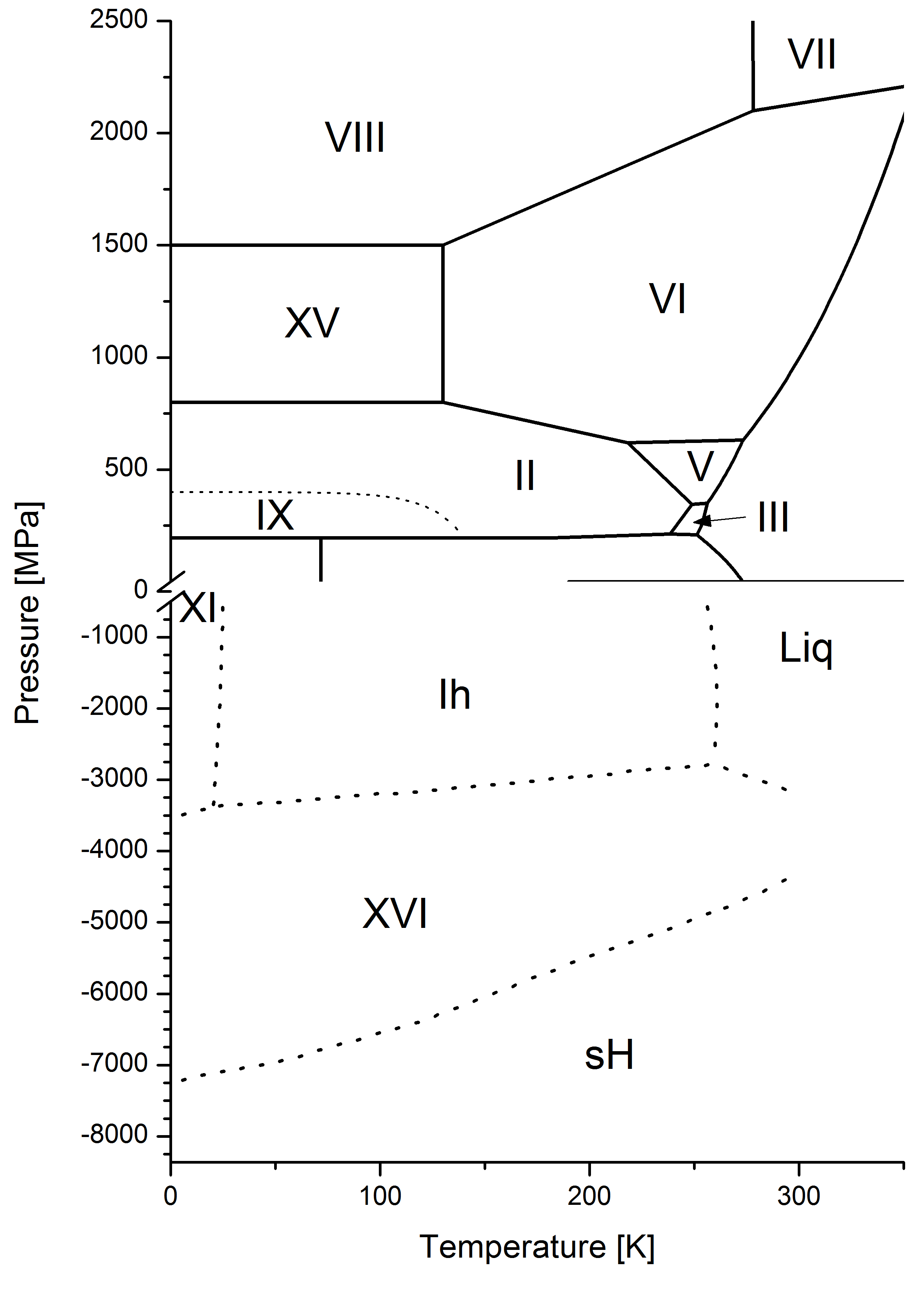
Water phase diagram extended to negative pressures calculated with TIP4P/2005 model.

Ice from a theorized superionic water may possess two crystalline structures. At pressures in excess of 50 GPa (7300000 psi) such superionic ice would take on a body-centered cubic structure. However, at pressures in excess of 100 GPa (15000000 psi) the structure may shift to a more stable face-centered cubic lattice. Some estimates suggest that at an extremely high pressure of around 1.55 TPa (225000000 psi), ice would develop metallic properties.

== Heat and entropy ==
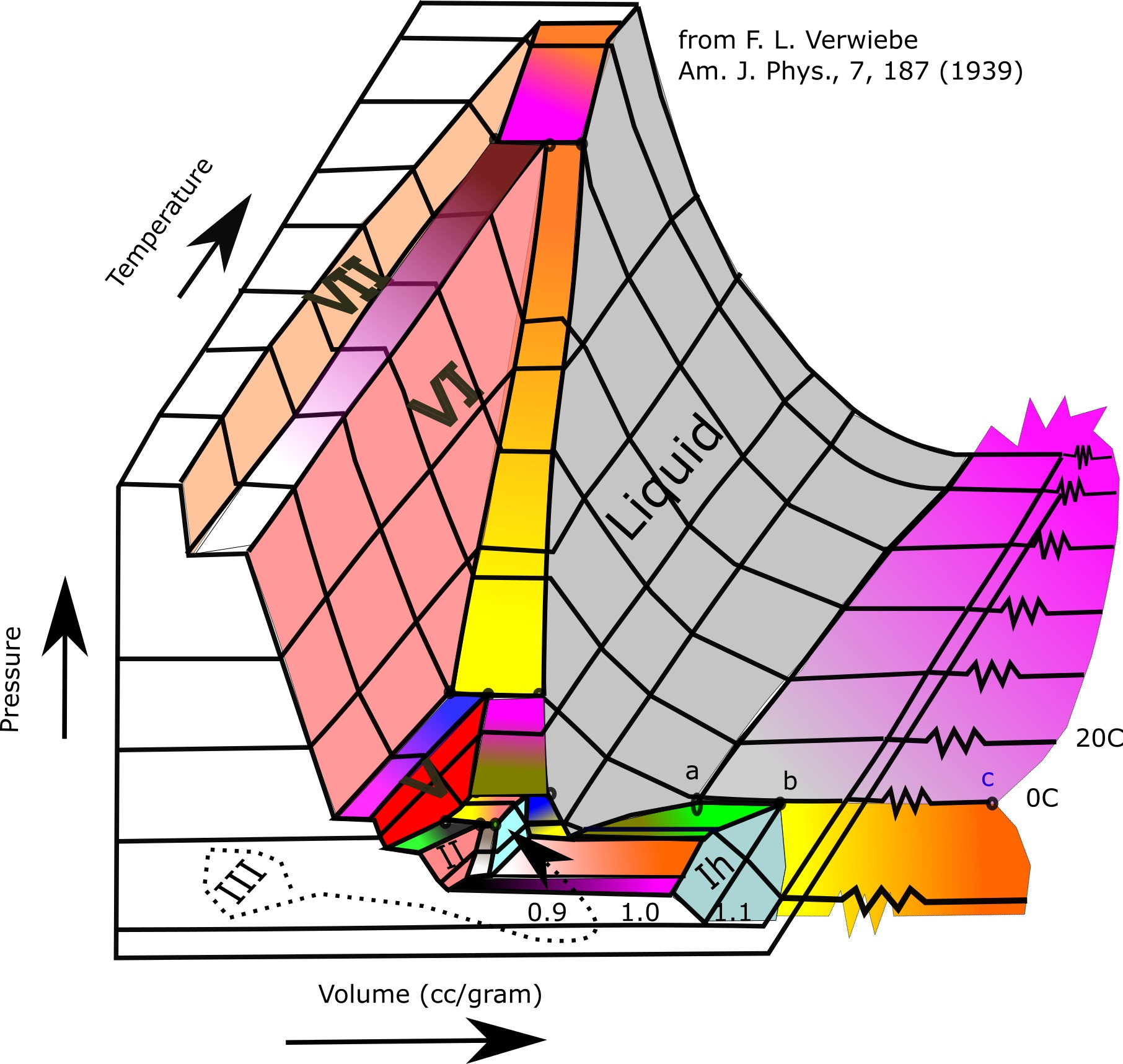
An alternative formulation of the phase diagram for certain ices and other phases of water

Ice, water, and water vapour can coexist at the triple point, which is 273.16 K (0.01 °C) at a pressure of 611.657 Pa. The kelvin was defined as 1/273.16 of the difference between this triple point and absolute zero, though this definition changed in May 2019. Unlike most other solids, ice is difficult to superheat. In an experiment, ice at −3 °C was superheated to about 17 °C for about 250 picoseconds.

Pressure dependence of ice melting

The latent heat of melting is 5987 J/mol, and its latent heat of sublimation is 50911 J/mol. The high latent heat of sublimation is principally indicative of the strength of the hydrogen bonds in the crystal lattice. The latent heat of melting is much smaller, partly because liquid water near 0 °C also contains a significant number of hydrogen bonds. By contrast, the structure of ice II is hydrogen-ordered, which helps to explain the entropy change of 3.22 J/mol when the crystal structure changes to that of ice I. Also, ice XI, an orthorhombic, hydrogen-ordered form of ice I_{h}, is considered the most stable form at low temperatures.

The transition entropy from ice XIV to ice XII is estimated to be 60% of Pauling entropy based on DSC measurements. The formation of ice XIV from ice XII is more favoured at high pressure.

When medium-density amorphous ice is compressed, released and then heated, it releases a large amount of heat energy, unlike other water ices which return to their normal form after getting similar treatment.

=== Hydrogen disorder ===
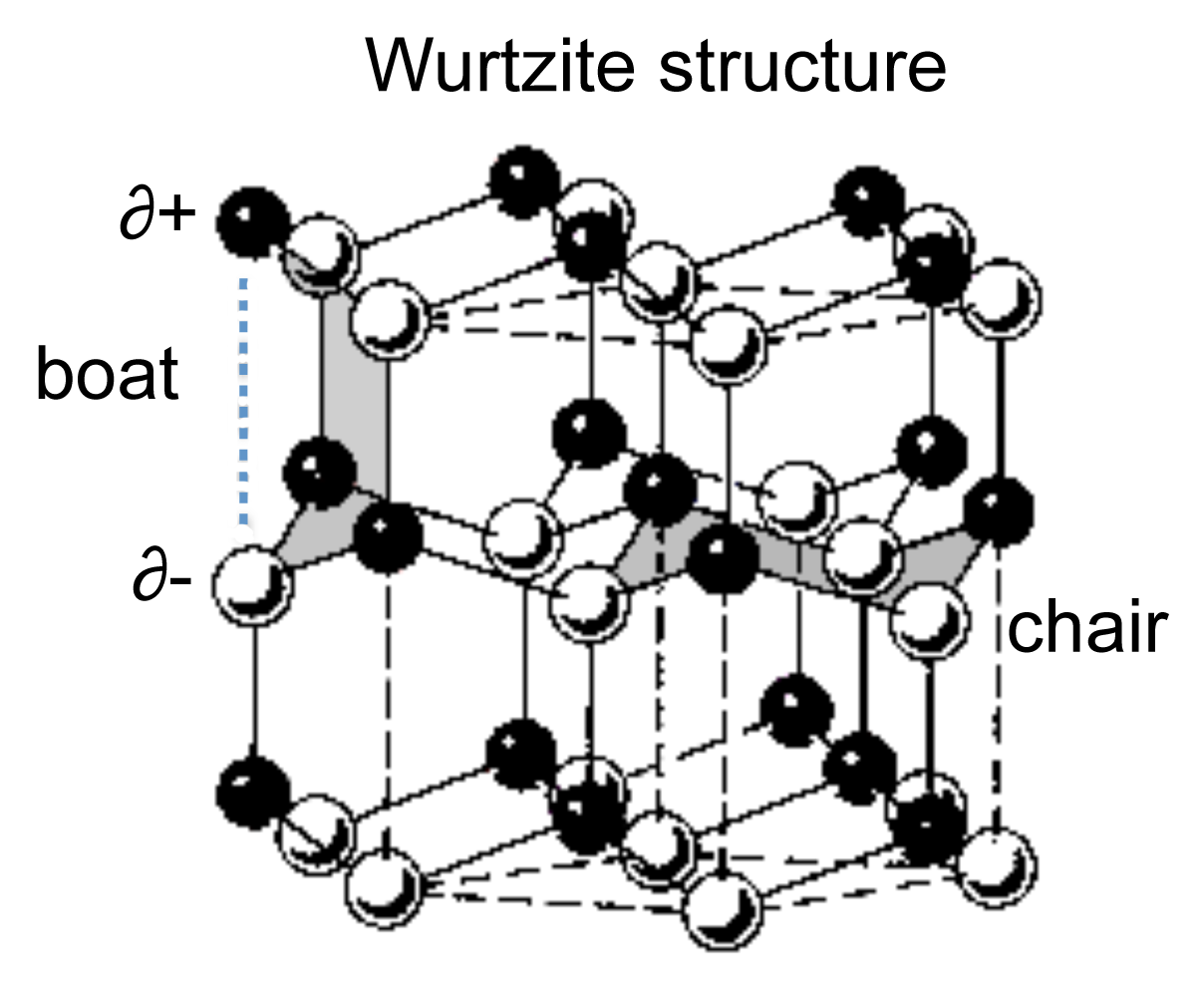
The Wurtzite structure. In Ice I_{h}, the oxygen atoms are arranged on the lattice points, and the hydrogen atoms are on the bonds between lattice points. Each oxygen atom has 4 neighboring ones. Note that the lattice bipartites into two subsets, here colored black and white.

The hydrogen atoms in the crystal lattice lie very nearly along the hydrogen bonds, and in such a way that each water molecule is preserved. This means that each oxygen atom in the lattice has two hydrogens adjacent to it: at about 101 pm along the 275 pm length of the bond for ice Ih. The crystal lattice allows a substantial amount of disorder in the positions of the hydrogen atoms frozen into the structure as it cools to absolute zero. As a result, the crystal structure contains some residual entropy inherent to the lattice and determined by the number of possible configurations of hydrogen positions that can be formed while still maintaining the requirement for each oxygen atom to have only two hydrogens in closest proximity, and each H-bond joining two oxygen atoms having only one hydrogen atom. This residual entropy S_{0} is equal to 3.4±0.1 J⋅mol^{−1}⋅K^{−1} = R ln(1.50 ± 0.02).

=== Calculations ===
There are various ways of approximating this number from first principles. The following is the one used by Linus Pauling.

Suppose there are a given number N of water molecules in an ice lattice. To compute its residual entropy, we need to count the number of configurations that the lattice can assume. The oxygen atoms are fixed at the lattice points, but the hydrogen atoms are located on the lattice edges. The problem is to pick one end of each lattice edge for the hydrogen to bond to, in a way that still makes sure each oxygen atom is bonded to two hydrogen atoms.

The oxygen atoms can be divided into two sets in a checkerboard pattern, shown in the picture as black and white balls. Focus attention on the oxygen atoms in one set: there are N/2 of them. Each has four hydrogen bonds, with two hydrogens close to it and two far away. This means there are $\tbinom 4 2 = 6$ allowed configurations of hydrogens for this oxygen atom (see Binomial coefficient). Thus, there are 6^{N/2} configurations that satisfy these N/2 atoms. But now, consider the remaining N/2 oxygen atoms: in general they won't be satisfied (i.e., they will not have precisely two hydrogen atoms near them). For each of those, there are 2^{4} = 16 possible placements of the hydrogen atoms along their hydrogen bonds, of which 6 are allowed. So, naively, we would expect the total number of configurations to be
$$6^{N/2} (6/16)^{N/2} = (3/2)^N .$$

Using Boltzmann's entropy formula, we conclude that
$$S_0 = k\ln(3/2)^N = n R \ln(3/2),$$
where k is the Boltzmann constant and R is the molar gas constant. So, the molar residual entropy is $R \ln(3/2) =$ 3.37 J⋅mol^{−1}⋅K^{−1}.

The same answer can be found in another way. First orient each water molecule randomly in each of the 6 possible configurations, then check that each lattice edge contains exactly one hydrogen atom. Assuming that the lattice edges are independent, then the probability that a single edge contains exactly one hydrogen atom is 1/2, and since there are 2N edges in total, we obtain a total configuration count $6^N \times (1/2)^{2N} = (3/2)^N$, as before.

=== Refinements ===
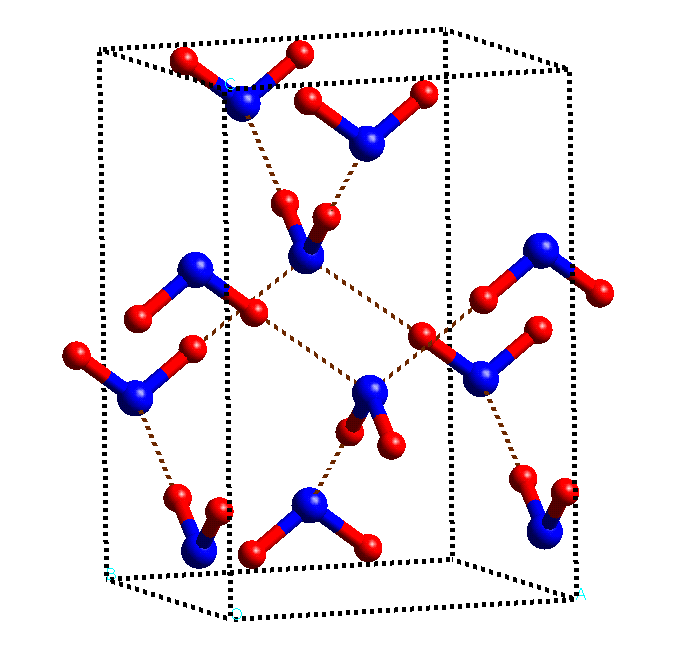
The crystal structure of ice VIII

This estimate is naive, as it assumes the six out of 16 hydrogen configurations for oxygen atoms in the second set can be independently chosen, which is false. More complex methods can be employed to better approximate the exact number of possible configurations, and achieve results closer to measured values. Nagle (1966) used a series summation to obtain $R\ln(1.50685 \pm 0.00015)$.

As an illustrative example of refinement, consider the following way to refine the second estimation method given above. According to it, six water molecules in a hexagonal ring would allow $6^6 \times (1/2)^6 = 729$ configurations. However, by explicit enumeration, there are actually 730 configurations. Now in the lattice, each oxygen atom participates in 12 hexagonal rings, so there are 2N rings in total for N oxygen atoms, or 2 rings for each oxygen atom, giving a refined result of $R\ln(1.5\times (730/729)^2) \approx R\ln(1.50411)$.

== Known phases ==
These phases are named according to the Bridgman nomenclature. The majority have only been created in the laboratory at different temperatures and pressures.

Phase	Year of discovery	Temperature thresholds	Pressure thresholds	Density	Crystal form	Other characteristics
Ice I_{h}	NA (natural ice)	273.15 K (0 °C) (freezing)	NA (atmospheric)	0.9167 g/cm^{3}	Hexagonal	Virtually all ice in the biosphere is ice I_{h}, with the exception only of a small amount of ice I_{c}. Has a refractive index of 1.31.
Ice I_{c}	1943/2020	130 and 220 K (−143 and −53 °C) (formation); 240 K (−33 °C) (conversion to Ice I_{h})	NA (atmospheric)	Similar to Ice I_{h}	Diamond cubic	A metastable cubic crystalline variant of ice.
Low-density amorphous ice (LDA)	1930s		NA (atmospheric or lower)	0.94 g/cm^{3}	NA (amorphous)	Likely the most common phase in the universe. More viscous than normal water.
Medium-density amorphous ice (MDA)	2023	73.15 K (−200 °C) (freezing)	NA (requires shear force)	1.06±0.06 g/cm^{3}	NA (amorphous)	Experimental procedure generates shear force by crushing ice into powder in a ball-mill with centimeter-wide stainless-steel balls added to its container.
High-density amorphous ice (HDA)	1984	<140 K (−133 °C) (normal formation); <30 K (−243.2 °C) (vapor deposition); 77 K (−196.2 °C) (stability point)	At 77 K (−196.2 °C): 1.6 GPa (formation from I_{h}); 0.5 GPa (formation from LDA)	1.17 g/cm^{3} (ambient pressure)	NA (amorphous)	
Very high-density amorphous ice (VHDA)	1996	160 K (−113 °C) (formation from HDA); 77 K (−196.2 °C) (stability point)	1 and 2 GPa (formation at 160 K (−113 °C)); ambient (at 77 K (−196.2 °C))	1.26 g/cm^{3} (77 K (−196.2 °C); ambient pressure)	NA (amorphous)	
Ice II	1900	190 K (−83 °C) – 210 K (−63 °C) (formation from ice I_{h}); 77 K (−196.2 °C) (stability point)	300 MPa		Rhombohedral	
Ice III	1900	250 K (−23 °C) (formation from liquid water); 77 K (−196.2 °C) (stability point)	300 MPa (formation from liquid water)	1.16 g/cm^{3} (at 350 MPa)	Tetragonal	Very high relative permittivity at 117. A specific gravity of 1.16 with respect to water.
Ice IV	1900	190 K (−83 °C) – 210 K (−63 °C) (formation from HDA); 77 K (−196.2 °C) (stability point)	810 MPa (formation from HDA)		Rhombohedral	Typically requires a nucleating agent to form.
Ice V	1900s	253 K (−20 °C) (formation from liquid water);	500 MPa (formation from liquid water)	1.24 g/cm^{3} (at 350 MPa).	Monoclinic	Most complicated structure of all the phases. Includes 4-membered, 5-membered, 6-membered, and 8-membered rings and a total of 28 molecules in the unit cell.
Ice VI	1912	270 K (−3 °C) (formation from liquid water); 130 K (−143 °C) - 355 K (82 °C) (stability range)	1.1 GPa (formation from liquid water)	1.31 g/cm^{3}	Tetragonal	Exhibits Debye relaxation.
Ice VII	1937	355 K (82 °C) (formation from ice VI)	2.2 GPa (formation from ice VI)	1.65 g/cm^{3}	Cubic	The hydrogen atoms' positions are disordered. Exhibits Debye relaxation. The hydrogen bonds form two interpenetrating lattices. Tetragonal form (contested) known as Ice VII_{t}.
Plastic Ice VII	2025	>470 K (formation from Ice VII)	>4 GPa (formation from liquid water)		Cubic	Orientationally disordered equivalent to Ice VII.
Ice VIII	1966	<278 K (5 °C) (formation from ice VII)	2.1 GPa (formation from ice VII)		Tetragonal	Proton-ordered equivalent to Ice VII.
Ice IX	1968	165 K (−108 °C) (formation from ice III); <140 K (−133 °C) (stability point)	200–400 MPa (stability range)	1.16 g/cm^{3}	Tetragonal	Proton-ordered equivalent to Ice III. Antiferroelectric.
Ice X	2022 (contested)	165 K (−108 °C) (formation from ice III); <140 K (−133 °C) (stability point)	30–70 GPa (from ice VII)	2.79 g/cm^{3}	Cubic	Has symmetrized hydrogen bonds – an oxygen atom is found at the center of two hydrogen atoms.
Ice XI	1972	72 K (−201.2 °C) (formation from ice I_{c})			Orthorhombic	Ferroelectric. The most stable configuration of ice I_{h}.
Ice XII	1996	260 K (−13 °C) (formation from liquid water); 77 K (−196.2 °C) (formation from ice I_{h}); 183 K (−90 °C) (formation from HDA ice)	0.55 GPa (formation from liquid water); 0.81–1.00 GPa/min (from ice I_{h}); 810 MPa (formation from HDA ice)	1.3 g/cm^{3} (at 127 K (−146 °C))	Tetragonal	Metastable. Observed in the phase space of ice V and ice VI. A topological mix of seven- and eight-membered rings, a 4-connected net (4-coordinate sphere packing)—the densest possible arrangement without hydrogen bond interpenetration.
Ice XIII	2006	130 K (−143 °C) (formation from liquid water)	500 MPa (formation from liquid water)		Monoclinic	The proton-ordered form of ice V.
Ice XIV	2006	<118 K (−155 °C) (formation from ice XII); <140 K (−133 °C) (stability point)	1.2 GPa (formation from ice XII)		Orthorhombic	The proton-ordered form of ice XII. Formation requires HCl doping.
Ice XV	2009	80 K (−193.2 °C) – 108 K (−165 °C) (formation from liquid water)	1.1GPa (formation from liquid water)			A proton-ordered form of ice VI formed by cooling water to around 80–108 K at 1.1 GPa.
Ice XVI	2014	<118 K (−155 °C) (formation from ice III); <140 K (−133 °C) (stability point)	1.2GPa (from ice VII)	0.81 g/cm^{3}		The least dense crystalline form of water, topologically equivalent to the empty structure of sII clathrate hydrates. Transforms into the stacking-faulty ice I_{c} and further into ordinary ice I_{h} when above 145–147 K at positive pressures. Theoretical studies predict ice XVI to be thermodynamically stable at negative pressures (that is under tension).
Square ice	2014	Room temperature (in the presence of graphene)	10GPa		Square	Formation likely driven by the van der Waals force, which allows water vapor and liquid water to pass through laminated sheets of graphene oxide, unlike smaller molecules such as helium.
Ice XVII	2016	<118 K (−155 °C) (formation from ice III); <140 K (−133 °C) (stability point)	1.2 GPa (from ice III)	Near that of ice XVI.	Hexagonal	A porous crystalline phase with helical channels. Formed by placing hydrogen-filled ice in a vacuum and increasing the temperature until the hydrogen molecules escape.
Ice XVIII	2019					A form of water also known as superionic water or superionic ice in which oxygen ions develop a face-centered cubic (fcc) crystalline structure while hydrogen ions move freely.
Ice XIX	2018	<100 K (−173 °C) (formation from ice VI_{h});	2 GPa (formation from ice VI_{h})			Formation requires HCl doping.
Ice XX	2021	900-1800 K (627 ~ 1527 °C) (from ice VII);	20-60 GPa (from ice VII);		Cubic	Another superionic ice
Ice XXI	2025	298 K (in the ice VI phase region)	1.6 GPa (in the ice VI phase region)	1.413 g/cm^{3}	Tetragonal	Metastable high-density ice appearing transiently between Ice VI and VII
Ice XXII	2026	298 K (25 °C) (formation from ice X)	310 GPa or 222 GPa (formation from ice X)	4.15 g/cm^{3}at 310 GPa, or 3.76 g/cm^{3} at 222 GPa	Orthorhombic	Distortion of body-centred cubic ice X, in which the oxygen atoms buckle.
	2026	1,800 K (1,527 °C)	200 GPa		Hexagonal close-packed	May relate to water ice conditions in ice giant planet interiors

== History of research ==
Phase diagram of water, showing the region where ice III is stable.

=== Ice II ===
The properties of ice II were first described and recorded by Gustav Tammann in 1900 during his experiments with ice under high pressure and low temperatures. Having produced ice III, Tammann then tried condensing the ice at a temperature between −70 and −80 °C (203 and 193 K; −94 and −112 °F) under 200 MPa (2000 atm) of pressure. Tammann noted that in this state ice II was denser than he had observed ice III to be. He also found that both types of ice can be kept at normal atmospheric pressure in a stable condition so long as the temperature is kept at that of liquid air, which slows the change in conformation back to ice I_{h}.

In later experiments by Bridgman in 1912, it was shown that the difference in volume between ice II and ice III was in the range of 0.0001 m^{3}/kg (2.8 cu in/lb). This difference had not been discovered by Tammann due to the small change and was why he had been unable to determine an equilibrium curve between the two. The curve showed that the structural change from ice III to ice II was more likely to happen if the medium had previously been in the structural conformation of ice II. However, if a sample of ice III that had never been in the ice II state was obtained, it could be supercooled even below −70 °C without it changing into ice II. Conversely, however, any superheating of ice II was not possible in regards to retaining the same form. Bridgman found that the equilibrium curve between ice II and ice IV was much the same as with ice III, having the same stability properties and small volume change. The curve between ice II and ice V was extremely different, however, with the curve's bubble being essentially a straight line and the volume difference being almost always 0.0000545 m^{3}/kg (1.51 cu in/lb).

==== Search for a hydrogen-disordered counterpart ====
As ice II is completely hydrogen ordered, the presence of its disordered counterpart is a great matter of interest. Shephard et al. investigated the phase boundaries of NH_{4}F-doped ices because NH_{4}F has been reported to be a hydrogen disordering reagent. However, adding 2.5 mol% of NH_{4}F resulted in the disappearance of ice II instead of the formation of a disordered ice II. According to the DFC calculation by Nakamura et al., the phase boundary between ice II and its disordered counterpart is estimated to be in the stability region of liquid water.

=== Ice IV ===
1981 research by Engelhardt and Kamb elucidated crystal structure of ice IV through a low-temperature single-crystal X-ray diffraction, describing it as a rhombohedral unit cell with a space group of R-3c. This research mentioned that the structure of ice IV could be derived from the structure of ice Ic by cutting and forming some hydrogen bondings and adding subtle structural distortions. Shephard et al. compressed the ambient phase of NH_{4}F, an isostructural material of ice, to obtain NH_{4}F II, whose hydrogen-bonded network is similar to ice IV. As the compression of ice Ih results in the formation of high-density amorphous ice (HDA), not ice IV, they claimed that the compression-induced conversion of ice I into ice IV is important, naming it "Engelhardt–Kamb collapse" (EKC). They suggested that the reason why we cannot obtain ice IV directly from ice Ih is that ice Ih is hydrogen-disordered; if oxygen atoms are arranged in the ice IV structure, hydrogen bonding may not be formed due to the donor-acceptor mismatch.

The disordered nature of Ice IV was confirmed by neutron powder diffraction studies by Lobban (1998) and Klotz et al. (2003). In addition, the entropy difference between ice VI (disordered phase) and ice IV is very small, according to Bridgman's measurement.

Several organic nucleating reagents had been proposed to selectively crystallize ice IV from liquid water, but even with such reagents, the crystallization of ice IV from liquid water was very difficult and seemed to be a random event. In 2001, Salzmann and his coworkers reported a whole new method to prepare ice IV reproducibly; when high-density amorphous ice (HDA) is heated at a rate of 0.4 K/min and a pressure of 0.81 GPa, ice IV is crystallized at about 165 K. What governs the crystallization products is the heating rate; fast heating (over 10 K/min) results in the formation of single-phase ice XII.

==== Search for a hydrogen-ordered counterpart ====
The ordered counterpart of ice IV has never been reported yet. 2011 research by Salzmann's group reported the DSC thermograms of HCl-doped ice IV finding an endothermic feature at about 120 K. Ten years later, Rosu-Finsen and Salzmann (2021) reported more detailed DSC data where the endothermic feature becomes larger as the sample is quench-recovered at higher pressure. They proposed three scenarios to explain the experimental results: weak hydrogen-ordering, orientational glass transition, and mechanical distortions.

=== Ice VII ===
Ice VII is the only disordered phase of ice that can be ordered by simple cooling. (While ice I_{h} theoretically transforms into proton-ordered ice XI on geologic timescales, in practice it is necessary to add small amounts of KOH catalyst.) It forms (ordered) ice VIII below 273 K up to ~8 GPa. Above this pressure, the VII–VIII transition temperature drops rapidly, reaching 0 K at ~60 GPa. Thus, ice VII has the largest stability field of all of the molecular phases of ice. The cubic oxygen sub-lattices that form the backbone of the ice VII structure persist to pressures of at least 128 GPa; this pressure is substantially higher than that at which water loses its molecular character entirely, forming ice X. In high pressure ices, protonic diffusion (movement of protons around the oxygen lattice) dominates molecular diffusion, an effect which has been measured directly.

=== Ice XI ===
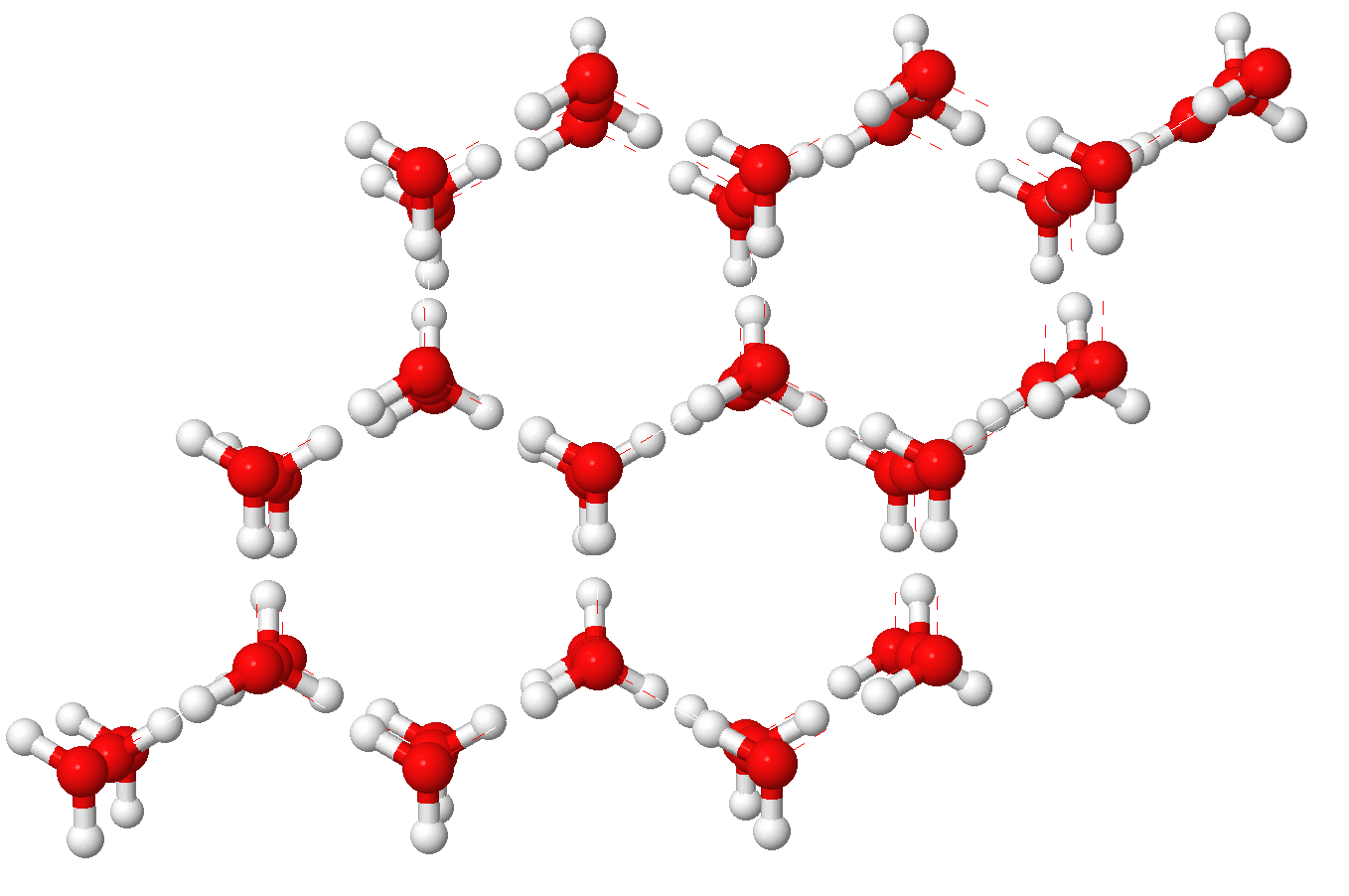
Crystal structure of Ice XI viewed along the c-axis

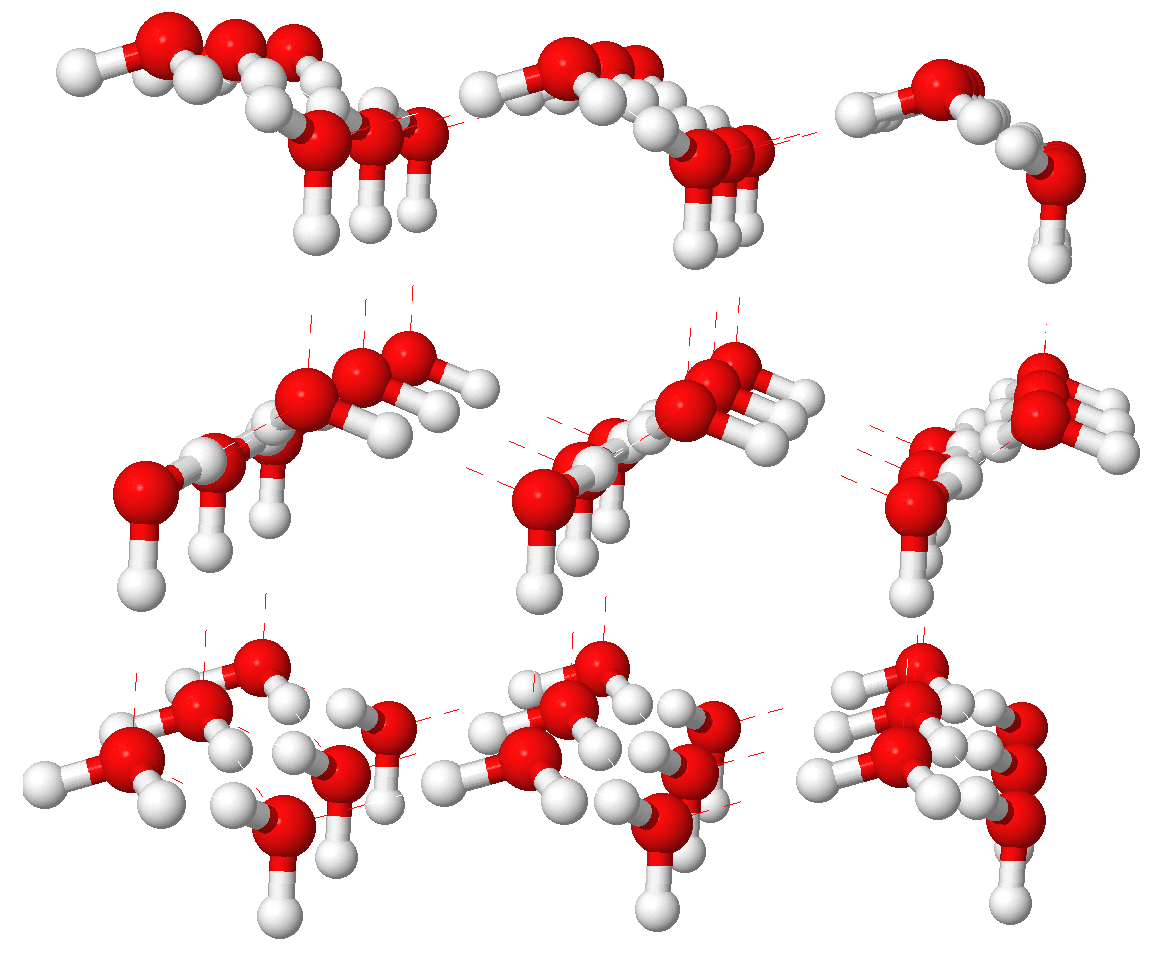
Crystal structure of ice XI (c-axis in the vertical direction)

Ice XI is the hydrogen-ordered form of the ordinary form of ice. The total internal energy of ice XI is about one sixth lower than ice I_{h}, so in principle it should naturally form when ice I_{h} is cooled to below 72 K. The low temperature required to achieve this transition is correlated with the relatively low energy difference between the two structures. Hints of hydrogen-ordering in ice had been observed as early as 1964, when Dengel et al. attributed a peak in thermo-stimulated depolarization (TSD) current to the existence of a proton-ordered ferroelectric phase. However, they could not conclusively prove that a phase transition had taken place, and Onsager pointed out that the peak could also arise from the movement of defects and lattice imperfections. Onsager suggested that experimentalists look for a dramatic change in heat capacity by performing a careful calorimetric experiment. A phase transition to ice XI was first identified experimentally in 1972 by Shuji Kawada and others.

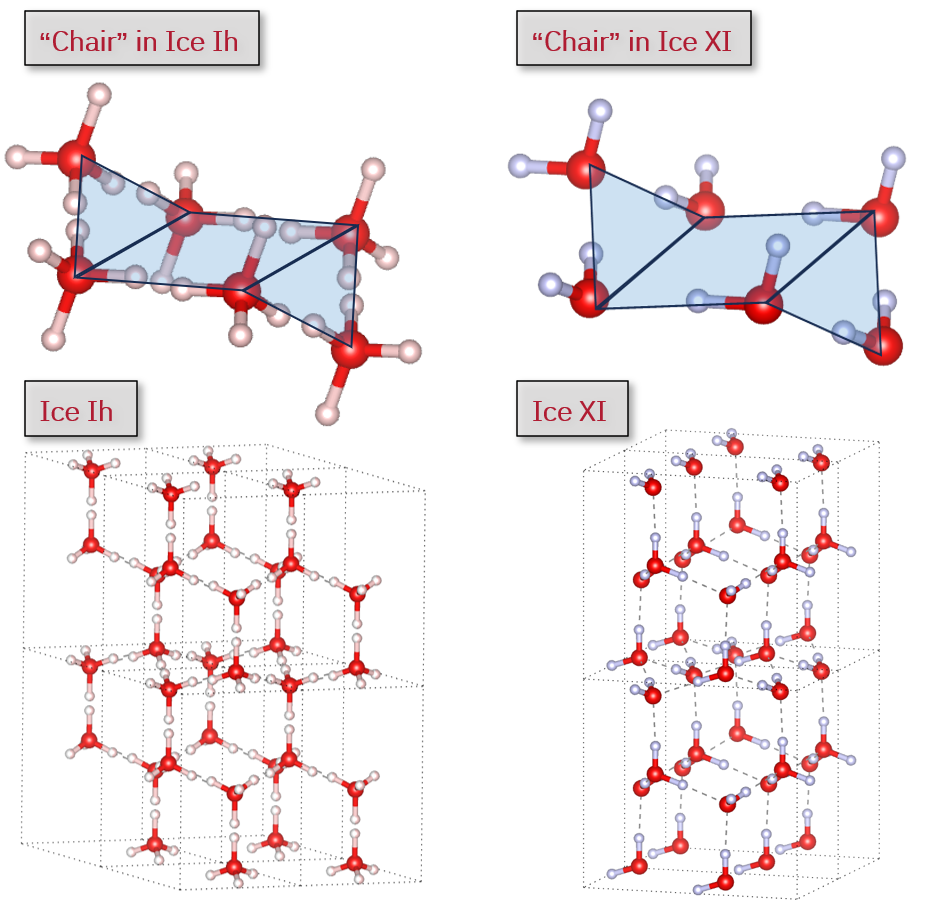
Hydrogen disordered and ordered 6-membered rings in the chair configuration that can be stacked to create the regular hexagonal ice (ice Ih) and its ordered counterpart ice XI

Water molecules in ice I_{h} are surrounded by four semi-randomly directed hydrogen bonds. Such arrangements should change to the more ordered arrangement of hydrogen bonds found in ice XI at low temperatures, so long as localized proton hopping is sufficiently enabled; a process that becomes easier with increasing pressure. Correspondingly, ice XI is believed to have a triple point with hexagonal ice and gaseous water at (~72 K, ~0 Pa). Ice I_{h} that has been transformed to ice XI and then back to ice I_{h}, on raising the temperature, retains some hydrogen-ordered domains and more easily transforms back to ice XI again. A neutron powder diffraction study found that small hydrogen-ordered domains can exist up to 111 K.

There are distinct differences in the Raman spectra between ices I_{h} and XI, with ice XI showing much stronger peaks in the translational (~230 cm^{−1}), librational (~630 cm^{−1}) and in-phase asymmetric stretch (~3200 cm^{−1}) regions.

Ice I_{c} also has a proton-ordered form. The total internal energy of ice XI_{c} was predicted as similar as ice XI_{h}.

==== Ferroelectric properties ====
Ice XI is ferroelectric, meaning that it has an intrinsic polarization. To qualify as a ferroelectric it must also exhibit polarization switching under an electric field, which has not been conclusively demonstrated but which is implicitly assumed to be possible. Cubic ice also has a ferroelectric phase and in this case the ferroelectric properties of the ice have been experimentally demonstrated on monolayer thin films. In a similar experiment, ferroelectric layers of hexagonal ice were grown on a platinum (111) surface. The material had a polarization that had a decay length of 30 monolayers suggesting that thin layers of ice XI can be grown on substrates at low temperature without the use of dopants. One-dimensional nano-confined ferroelectric ice XI was created in 2010.

=== Ice XV ===
Although the parent phase ice VI was discovered in 1935, corresponding proton-ordered forms (ice XV) had not been observed until 2009. Theoretically, the proton ordering in ice VI was predicted several times; for example, density functional theory calculations predicted the phase transition temperature is 108 K and the most stable ordered structure is antiferroelectric in the space group Cc, while an antiferroelectric P2_{1}2_{1}2_{1} structure were found 4 K per water molecule higher in energy.

On 14 June 2009, Christoph Salzmann and colleagues at the University of Oxford reported having experimentally reported an ordered phase of ice VI, named ice XV, and say that its properties differ significantly from those predicted. In particular, ice XV is antiferroelectric rather than ferroelectric as had been predicted.

In detail, ice XV has a smaller density (larger unit-cell volume) than ice VI. This makes the VI-to-XV disorder-to-order transition much favoured at low pressures. Indeed, differential scanning calorimetry by Shephard and Salzmann revealed that reheating quench-recovered HCl-doped ice XV at ambient pressure even produces exotherms originating from transient ordering, i.e. more ordered ice XV is obtained at ambient pressure. Being consistent with this, the ice VI-XV transition is reversible at ambient pressure. It was also shown that HCl-doping is selectively effective in producing ice XV while other acids and bases (HF, LiOH, HClO_{4}, HBr) do not significantly enhance ice XV formations.

Based on powder neutron diffraction, the crystal structure of ice XV has been investigated in detail. Some researchers suggested that, in combination with density functional theory calculations, none of the possible perfectly ordered orientational configurations are energetically favoured. This implies that there are several energetically close configurations that coexist in ice XV. They proposed 'the orthorhombic Pmmn space group as a plausible space group to describe the time-space averaged structure of ice XV. Other researchers argued that P-1 model is still the best (with the second best candidate of P2_{1}), whereas Rietveld refinement using the Pmmn space group only works well for poorly ordered samples. The lattice parameters, in particular b and c, are good indicators of the ice XV formation. Combining density functional theory calculations, they successfully constructed fully ordered model in P-1 and showed that experimental diffraction data should be analysed using space groups that permit full hydrogen order while the Pmmn model only accepts partially ordered structures.

=== Ice XVII ===
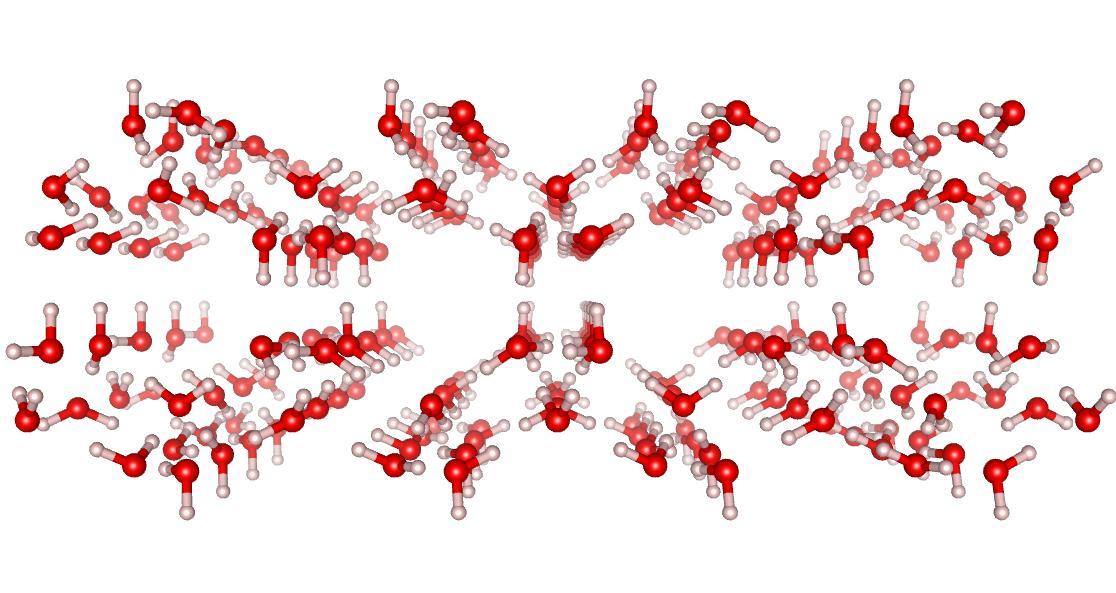
Crystal structure of ice XVII

In 2016, the discovery of a new form of ice was announced. Characterized as a "porous water ice metastable at atmospheric temperatures", this new form was discovered by taking a filled ice and removing the non-water components, leaving the crystal structure behind, similar to how ice XVI, another porous form of ice, was synthesized from a clathrate hydrate.

To create ice XVII, the researchers first produced filled ice in a stable phase named C_{0} from a mixture of hydrogen (H_{2}) and water (H_{2}O), using temperatures from 100 to 270 K (−173 to −3 °C; −280 to 26 °F) and pressures from 360 to 700 MPa (52,000 to 102,000 psi; 3,600 to 6,900 atm), and C_{2} are all stable solid phases of a mixture of H_{2} and H_{2}O molecules, formed at high pressures. Although sometimes referred to as clathrate hydrates (or clathrates), they lack the cagelike structure generally found in clathrate hydrates, and are more properly referred to as filled ices. The filled ice is then placed in a vacuum, and the temperature gradually increased until the hydrogen frees itself from the crystal structure. If kept at a temperature range between 110 and 120 K (−163 and −153 °C; −262 and −244 °F), after about two hours, the structure will have emptied itself of any detectable hydrogen molecules. The resulting form is metastable at room pressure while under 120 K (−153 °C; −244 °F), but collapses into ice I_{h} (ordinary ice) when brought above 130 K (−143 °C; −226 °F). The crystal structure is hexagonal in nature, and the pores are helical channels with a diameter of about 6.10 Å (6.10×10^{−10} m; 2.40×10^{−8} in).

=== Cubic ice ===
It was reported in 2020 that cubic ice based on heavy water (D_{2}O) can be formed from ice XVII. This was done by heating specifically prepared D_{2}O ice XVII powder. The result was free of structural deformities compared to standard cubic ice, or ice I_{sd}. This discovery was reported around the same time another research group announced that they were able to obtain pure D_{2}O cubic ice by first synthesizing filled ice in the C_{2} phase, and then decompressing it.

=== Ice XVIII (superionic water) ===
In the absence of an applied electric field, H^{+} ions diffuse in the O^{2−} lattice.

When an electric field is applied, H^{+} ions migrate towards the anode.

A remarkable characteristic of superionic ice is its ability to act as a conductor.

In 1988, predictions of the so-called superionic water state were made. In superionic water, water molecules break apart and the oxygen ions crystallize into an evenly spaced lattice while the hydrogen ions float around freely within the oxygen lattice. The freely mobile hydrogen ions make superionic water almost as conductive as typical metals, making it a superionic conductor. The ice appears black in color. It is distinct from ionic water, which is a hypothetical liquid state characterized by a disordered soup of hydrogen and oxygen ions.

The initial evidence came from optical measurements of laser-heated water in a diamond anvil cell, and from optical measurements of water shocked by extremely powerful lasers. The first definitive evidence for the crystal structure of the oxygen lattice in superionic water came from x-ray measurements on laser-shocked water which were reported in 2019. In 2005 Laurence Fried led a team at Lawrence Livermore National Laboratory (LLNL) to recreate the formative conditions of superionic water. Using a technique involving smashing water molecules between diamonds and super heating it with lasers they observed frequency shifts which indicated that a phase transition had taken place. The team also created computer models which indicated that they had indeed created superionic water. In 2013 Hugh F. Wilson, Michael L. Wong, and Burkhard Militzer at the University of California, Berkeley published a paper predicting the face-centered cubic lattice structure that would emerge at higher pressures. Additional experimental evidence was found by Marius Millot and colleagues in 2018 by inducing high pressure on water between diamonds and then shocking the water using a laser pulse.

As of 2013, it is theorized that superionic ice can possess two crystalline structures. At pressures in excess of 50 GPa (7300000 psi) it is predicted that superionic ice would take on a body-centered cubic structure. However, at pressures in excess of 100 GPa, and temperatures above 2000 K, it is predicted that the structure would shift to a more stable face-centered cubic lattice.

In 2018, the existence of superionic ice was confirmed in a laboratory setting. To create the required pressure, LLNL researchers compressed small amounts of water between pieces of diamond. At 2500 MPa (360000 psi), the water became ice VII, a form that is solid at room temperature. This ice, trapped within diamond anvil cells, was taken to the University of Rochester to be blasted with a laser. For less than a billionth of a second, the ice was subjected to conditions similar to those within the mantle of an ice giant. The temperature in the diamond cells rose thousands of degrees, and the pressure increased to over a million times that of Earth's atmosphere. The experiment concluded that the current in the conductive water was indeed carried by ions rather than electrons and thus pointed to the water being superionic. More recent experiments from the same LLNL team used x-ray crystallography on laser-shocked water droplets to determine that the oxygen ions enter a face-centered-cubic phase, which was dubbed ice XVIII and reported in the journal Nature in May 2019.

=== Ice XIX ===
The first report regarding ice XIX was published in 2018 by Thomas Loerting's group from Austria. They quenched HCl-doped ice VI to 77 K at different pressures between 1.0 and 1.8 GPa to collect differential scanning calorimetry (DSC) thermograms, dielectric spectrum, Raman spectrum, and X-ray diffraction patterns. In the DSC signals, there was an endothermic feature at about 110 K in addition to the endotherm corresponding to the ice XV-VI transition. Additionally, the Raman spectra, dielectric properties, and the ratio of the lattice parameters differed from those of ice XV. Based on these observations, they proposed the existence of a second hydrogen-ordered phase of ice VI, naming it ice beta-XV.

In 2019, Alexander Rosu-Finsen and Christoph Salzman argued that there was no need to consider this to be a new phase of ice, and proposed a "deep-glassy" state scenario. According to their DSC data, the size of the endothermic feature depends not only on quench-recovery pressure but also on the heating rate and annealing duration at 93 K. They also collected neutron diffraction profiles of quench-recovered deuterium chloride-doped, D_{2}O ice VI/XV prepared at different pressures of 1.0, 1.4 and 1.8 GPa, to show that there were no significant differences among them. They concluded that the low-temperature endotherm originated from kinetic features related to glass transitions of deep glassy states of disordered ice VI.

Distinguishing between the two scenarios (new hydrogen-ordered phase vs. deep-glassy disordered ice VI) became an open question and the debate between the two groups has continued. Thoeny et al. (Loerting's group) collected another series of Raman spectra of ice beta-XV, and reported that (i) ice XV prepared by the protocol reported previously contains both ice XV and ice beta-XV domains; (ii) upon heating, Raman spectra of ice beta-XV showed loss of H-order. In contrast, Salzmann's group again argued for the plausibility of a 'deep-glassy state' scenario based on neutron diffraction and neutron inelastic scattering experiments. Based on their experimental results, ice VI and deep-glassy ice VI share very similar features based on both elastic (diffraction) scattering and inelastic scattering experiments, and are different from the properties of ice XV.

In 2021, further crystallographic evidence for a new phase (ice XIX) was individually reported by three groups: Yamane et al. (Hiroyuki Kagi and Kazuki Komatsu's group from Japan), Gasser et al. (Loerting's group), and Salzmann's group. Yamane et al. collected neutron diffraction profiles in situ (i.e. under high pressure) and found new Bragg features completely different from both ice VI and ice XV. They performed Rietveld refinement of the profiles based on the $\sqrt{2} \times \sqrt{2} \times 1$ supercell of ice XV and proposed some leading candidates for the space group of ice XIX: P-4, Pca21, Pcc2, P21/a, and P21/c. They also measured dielectric spectra in situ and determined phase boundaries of ices VI/XV/XIX. They found that the sign of the slope of the boundary turns negative from positive at 1.6 GPa indicating the existence of two different phases by the Clausius–Clapeyron relation.

Gasser et al. also collected powder neutron diffractograms of quench-recovered ices VI, XV, and XIX and found similar crystallographic features to those reported by Yamane et al., concluding that P-4 and Pcc2 are the plausible space group candidates. Both Yamane et al.'s and Gasser et al.'s results suggested a partially hydrogen-ordered structure. Gasser et al. also found an isotope effect using DSC; the low-temperature endotherm for DCl-doped D_{2}O ice XIX was significantly smaller than that of HCl-doped H_{2}O ice XIX, and that doping of 0.5% of H_{2}O into D_{2}O is sufficient for the ordering transition.

Several months later, Salzmann et al. published a paper based on in-situ powder neutron diffraction experiments of ice XIX. In a change from their previous reports, they accepted the idea of the new phase (ice XIX) as they observed similar features to the previous two reports. However, they refined their diffraction profiles based on a disordered structural model (Pbcn) and argued that new Bragg reflections can be explained by distortions of ice VI, so ice XIX may still be regarded as a deep-glassy state of ice VI. The crystal structure of ice XIX including hydrogen order/disorder is still under debate as of 2022.

=== Plastic ice VII ===
Plastic ice VII is a newly identified phase of water ice characterized by a crystalline structure in which water molecules retain fixed positions but rotate freely, exhibiting liquid-like rotational dynamics. Discovered through quasi-elastic neutron scattering (QENS) experiments at pressures above 4 GPa and temperatures above 470 K, this phase maintains the body-centered cubic lattice of ice VII while allowing rapid molecular reorientations on the picosecond timescale. Unlike free rotor phases, the rotational motion in plastic ice VII occurs via discrete jumps between preferred orientations dictated by the crystal field. Its identification resolves long-standing predictions from molecular dynamics simulations and suggests potential implications for the internal dynamics and differentiation of icy planets and moons.

== Practical implications ==
=== Earth's natural environment ===
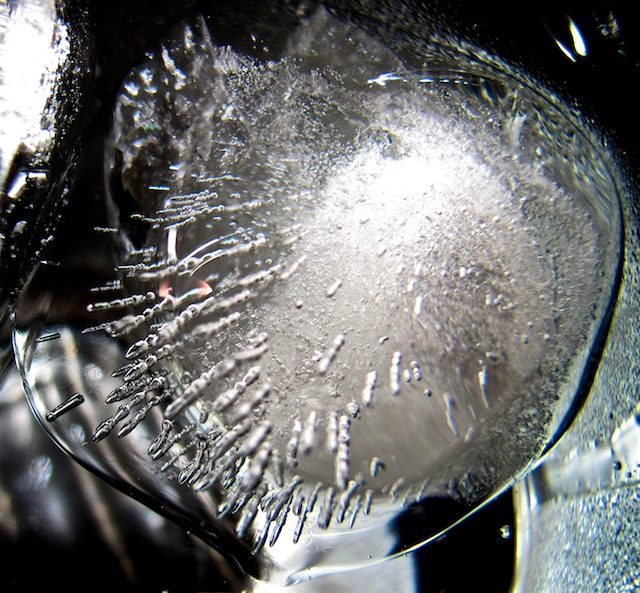
Photograph showing details of an ice cube under magnification. Ice I_{h} is the form of ice commonly seen on Earth.

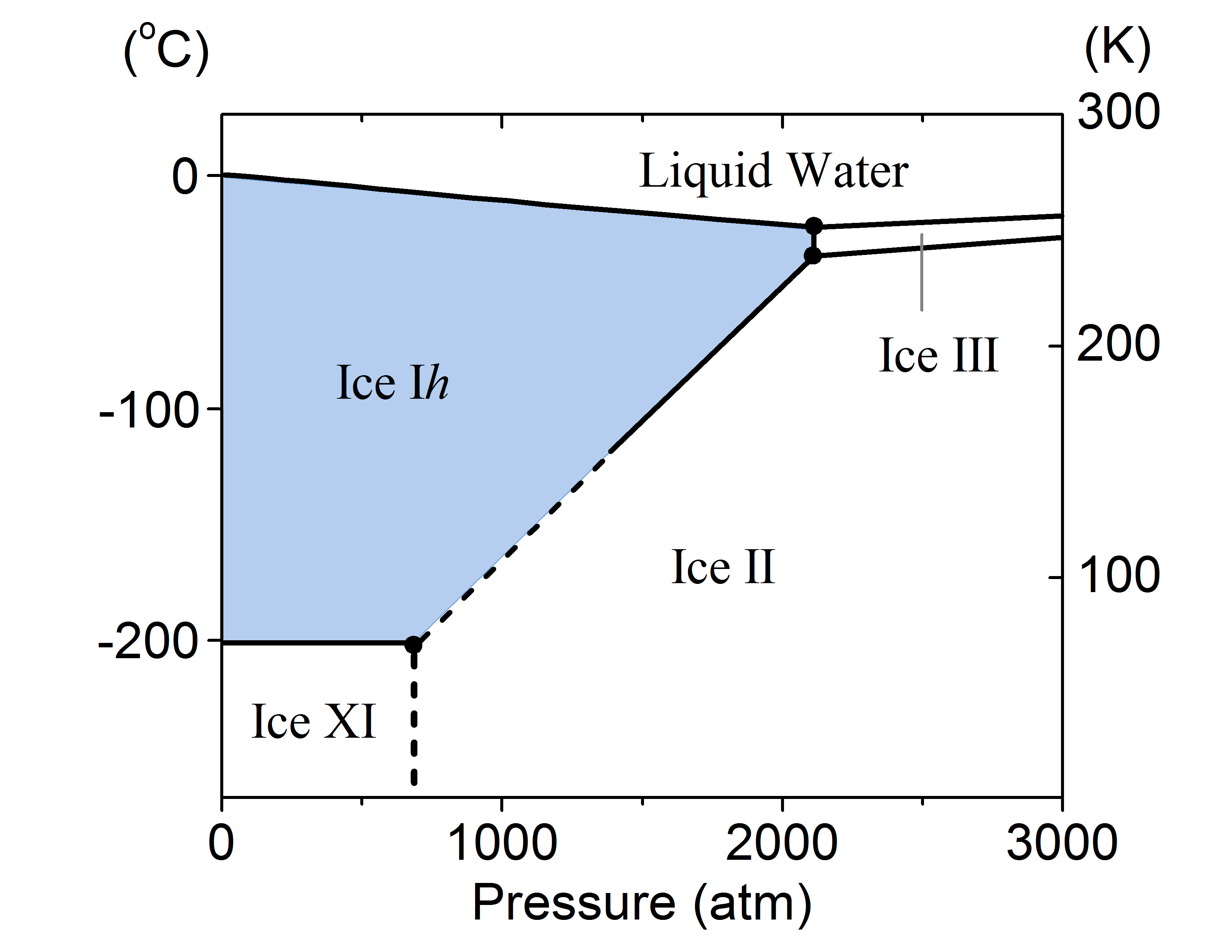
Phase space of ice I_{h} with respect to other ice phases.

Virtually all ice in the biosphere is ice I_{h} (pronounced: "ice one h" and also known as "ice-phase-one"). Ice I_{h} exhibits many peculiar properties that are relevant to the existence of life and regulation of global climate. For instance, its density is lower than that of liquid water. This is attributed to the presence of hydrogen bonds which causes atoms to become closer in the liquid phase. Because of this, ice I_{h} floats on water, which is highly unusual when compared to other materials. The solid phase of materials is usually more closely and neatly packed and has a higher density than the liquid phase. When lakes freeze, they do so only at the surface, while the bottom of the lake remains near 4 °C (277 K; 39 °F) because water is densest at this temperature. This anomalous behavior of water and ice is what allows fish to survive harsh winters. The density of ice I_{h} increases when cooled, down to about −211 °C (62 K; −348 °F); below that temperature, the ice expands again (negative thermal expansion).

Besides ice I_{h}, a small amount of ice I_{c} may occasionally present in the upper atmosphere clouds. It is believed to be responsible for the observation of Scheiner's halo, a rare ring that occurs near 28 degrees from the Sun or the Moon. However, many atmospheric samples which were previously described as cubic ice were later shown to be stacking disordered ice with trigonal symmetry, and it has been dubbed the ″most faceted ice phase in a literal and a more general sense.″ The first true samples of cubic ice were only reported in 2020.

Low-density ASW (LDA), also known as hyperquenched glassy water, may be responsible for noctilucent clouds on Earth and is usually formed by deposition of water vapor in cold or vacuum conditions. Ice clouds form at and below the Earth's high latitude mesopause (~90 km) where temperatures have been observed to fall to below 100 K. It has been suggested that homogeneous nucleation of ice particles results in low density amorphous ice. Amorphous ice is likely confined to the coldest parts of the clouds and stacking disordered ice I is thought to dominate elsewhere in these polar mesospheric clouds.

In 2018, ice VII was identified among inclusions found in natural diamonds. Due to this demonstration that ice VII exists in nature, the International Mineralogical Association duly classified ice VII as a distinct mineral. The ice VII was presumably formed when water trapped inside the diamonds retained the high pressure of the deep mantle due to the strength and rigidity of the diamond lattice, but cooled down to surface temperatures, producing the required environment of high pressure without high temperature.

Ice XI is thought to be a more stable conformation than ice I_{h}, and so it may form on Earth. However, the transformation is very slow. According to one report, in Antarctic conditions it is estimated to take at least 100,000 years to form without the assistance of catalysts. Ice XI was sought and found in Antarctic ice that was about 100 years old in 1998. A further study in 2004 was not able to reproduce this finding, however, after studying Antarctic ice which was around 3000 years old. The 1998 Antarctic study also claimed that the transformation temperature (ice XI => ice I_{h}) is −36 °C (237 K), which is far higher than the temperature of the expected triple point mentioned above (72 K, ~0 Pa). Ice XI was also found in experiments using pure water at very low temperature (~10 K) and low pressure – conditions thought to be present in the upper atmosphere. Recently, small domains of ice XI were found to form in pure water; its phase transition back to ice I_{h} occurred at 72 K while under hydrostatic pressure conditions of up to 70 MPa.

=== Human industry ===
Amorphous ice is used in some scientific experiments, especially in cryo-electron microscopy of biomolecules. The individual molecules can be preserved for imaging in a state close to what they are in liquid water.

Ice XVII can repeatedly adsorb and release hydrogen molecules without degrading its structure. The total amount of hydrogen that ice XVII can absorb depends on the amount of pressure applied, but hydrogen molecules can be adsorbed by ice XVII even at pressures as low as a few millibars (Note: One millibar is equivalent to 100 Pa (0.015 psi; 0.00099 atm).) if the temperature is under 40 K (−233.2 °C; −387.7 °F). The adsorbed hydrogen molecules can then be released, or desorbed, through the application of heat. This was an unexpected property of ice XVII, and could allow it to be used for hydrogen storage, an issue often mentioned in environmental technology.

Aside from storing hydrogen via compression or liquification, it can also be stored within a solid substance, either via a reversible chemical process (chemisorption) or by having the hydrogen molecules attach to the substance via the van der Waals force (physisorption). The latter process can occur within ice XVII. In physisorption, there is no chemical reaction, and the chemical bond between the two atoms within a hydrogen molecule remains intact. Because of this, the number of adsorption–desorption cycles ice XVII can withstand is "theoretically infinite".

One significant advantage of using ice XVII as a hydrogen storage medium is the low cost of the only two chemicals involved: hydrogen and water. In addition, ice XVII has shown the ability to store hydrogen at an H_{2} to H_{2}O molar ratio above 40%, higher than the theoretical maximum ratio for sII clathrate hydrates, another potential storage medium. However, if ice XVII is used as a storage medium, it must be kept under a temperature of 130 K (−143 °C; −226 °F) or risk being destabilized.

=== Outer space ===
In outer space, hexagonal crystalline ice (the predominant form found on Earth) is extremely rare. Known examples are typically associated with volcanic action. Water in the interstellar medium is instead dominated by amorphous ice, making it likely the most common form of water in the universe.

Amorphous ice can be separated from crystalline ice based on its near-infrared and infrared spectrum. At near-IR wavelengths, the characteristics of the 1.65, 3.1, and 4.53 μm water absorption lines are dependent on the ice temperature and crystal order. The peak strength of the 1.65 μm band as well as the structure of the 3.1 μm band are particularly useful in identifying the crystallinity of water ice.

At longer IR wavelengths, amorphous and crystalline ice have characteristically different absorption bands at 44 and 62 μm in that the crystalline ice has significant absorption at 62 μm while amorphous ice does not. In addition, these bands can be used as a temperature indicator at very low temperatures where other indicators (such as the 3.1 and 12 μm bands) fail. This is useful studying ice in the interstellar medium and circumstellar disks. However, observing these features is difficult because the atmosphere is opaque at these wavelengths, requiring the use of space-based infrared observatories.

==== Properties of the amorphous ice in the Solar System ====
In general, amorphous ice can form below ~130 K. At this temperature, water molecules are unable to form the crystalline structure commonly found on Earth. Amorphous ice may also form in the coldest region of the Earth's atmosphere, the summer polar mesosphere, where noctilucent clouds exist. These low temperatures are readily achieved in astrophysical environments such as molecular clouds, circumstellar disks, and the surfaces of objects in the outer Solar System. In the laboratory, amorphous ice transforms into crystalline ice if it is heated above 130 K, although the exact temperature of this conversion is dependent on the environment and ice growth conditions. The reaction is irreversible and exothermic, releasing 1.26–1.6 kJ/mol.

An additional factor in determining the structure of water ice is deposition rate. Even if it is cold enough to form amorphous ice, crystalline ice will form if the flux of water vapor onto the substrate is less than a temperature-dependent critical flux. This effect is important to consider in astrophysical environments where the water flux can be low. Conversely, amorphous ice can be formed at temperatures higher than expected if the water flux is high, such as flash-freezing events associated with cryovolcanism.

At temperatures less than 77 K, irradiation from ultraviolet photons as well as high-energy electrons and ions can damage the structure of crystalline ice, transforming it into amorphous ice. Amorphous ice does not appear to be significantly affected by radiation at temperatures less than 110 K, though some experiments suggest that radiation might lower the temperature at which amorphous ice begins to crystallize.

Peter Jenniskens and David F. Blake demonstrated in 1994 that a form of high-density amorphous ice is also created during vapor deposition of water on low-temperature (< 30 K) surfaces such as interstellar grains. The water molecules do not fully align to create the open cage structure of low-density amorphous ice. Many water molecules end up at interstitial positions. When warmed above 30 K, the structure re-aligns and transforms into the low-density form.

==== Molecular clouds, circumstellar disks, and the primordial solar nebula ====
Molecular clouds have extremely low temperatures (~10 K), falling well within the amorphous ice regime. The presence of amorphous ice in molecular clouds has been observationally confirmed. When molecular clouds collapse to form stars, the temperature of the resulting circumstellar disk isn't expected to rise above 120 K, indicating that the majority of the ice should remain in an amorphous state. However, if the temperature rises high enough to sublimate the ice, then it can re-condense into a crystalline form since the water flux rate is so low. This is expected to be the case in the circumstellar disk of IRAS 09371+1212, where signatures of crystallized ice were observed despite a low temperature of 30–70 K.

For the primordial solar nebula, there is much uncertainty as to the crystallinity of water ice during the circumstellar disk and planet formation phases. If the original amorphous ice survived the molecular cloud collapse, then it should have been preserved at heliocentric distances beyond Saturn's orbit (~12 AU).

==== Comets ====
The possibility of the presence of amorphous water ice in comets and the release of energy during the phase transition to a crystalline state was first proposed as a mechanism for comet outbursts. Evidence of amorphous ice in comets is found in the high levels of activity observed in long-period, Centaur, and Jupiter Family comets at heliocentric distances beyond ~6 AU. These objects are too cold for the sublimation of water ice, which drives comet activity closer to the Sun, to have much of an effect. Thermodynamic models show that the surface temperatures of those comets are near the amorphous/crystalline ice transition temperature of ~130 K, supporting this as a likely source of the activity. The runaway crystallization of amorphous ice can produce the energy needed to power outbursts such as those observed for Centaur Comet 29P/Schwassmann–Wachmann 1.

==== Kuiper Belt objects ====
With radiation equilibrium temperatures of 40–50 K, the objects in the Kuiper Belt are expected to have amorphous water ice. While water ice has been observed on several objects, the extreme faintness of these objects makes it difficult to determine the structure of the ices. The signatures of crystalline water ice was observed on 50000 Quaoar, perhaps due to resurfacing events such as impacts or cryovolcanism.

==== Icy moons ====
The Near-Infrared Mapping Spectrometer (NIMS) on NASA's Galileo spacecraft spectroscopically mapped the surface ice of the Jovian satellites Europa, Ganymede, and Callisto. The temperatures of these moons range from 90 to 160 K, warm enough that amorphous ice is expected to crystallize on relatively short timescales. However, it was found that Europa has primarily amorphous ice, Ganymede has both amorphous and crystalline ice, and Callisto is primarily crystalline. This is thought to be the result of competing forces: the thermal crystallization of amorphous ice versus the conversion of crystalline to amorphous ice by the flux of charged particles from Jupiter. Closer to Jupiter than the other three moons, Europa receives the highest level of radiation and thus through irradiation has the most amorphous ice. Callisto is the farthest from Jupiter, receiving the lowest radiation flux and therefore maintaining its crystalline ice. Ganymede, which lies between the two, exhibits amorphous ice at high latitudes and crystalline ice at the lower latitudes. This is thought to be the result of the moon's intrinsic magnetic field, which would funnel the charged particles to higher latitudes and protect the lower latitudes from irradiation. Ganymede's interior probably includes a liquid water ocean with tens to hundreds of kilometers of ice V at its base.

The surface ice of Saturn's moon Enceladus was mapped by the Visual and Infrared Mapping Spectrometer (VIMS) on the NASA/ESA/ASI Cassini space probe. The probe found both crystalline and amorphous ice, with a higher degree of crystallinity at the "tiger stripe" cracks on the surface and more amorphous ice between these regions. The crystalline ice near the tiger stripes could be explained by higher temperatures caused by geological activity that is the suspected cause of the cracks. The amorphous ice might be explained by flash freezing from cryovolcanism, rapid condensation of molecules from water geysers, or irradiation of high-energy particles from Saturn. Similarly, one of the inner layers of Titan is believed to contain ice VI.

Medium-density amorphous ice may be present on Europa, as the experimental conditions of its formation are expected to occur there as well. It is possible that the MDA ice's unique property of releasing a large amount of heat energy after being released from compression could be responsible for 'ice quakes' within the thick ice layers.

==== Planets ====
Because ice XI can theoretically form at low pressures at temperatures between 50–70 K – temperatures present in astrophysical environments of the outer solar system and within permanently shaded polar craters on the Moon and Mercury. Ice XI forms most easily around 70 K – paradoxically, it takes longer to form at lower temperatures. Extrapolating from experimental measurements, it is estimated to take ~50 years to form at 70 K and ~300 million years at 50 K. It is theorized to be present in places like the upper atmospheres of Uranus and Neptune and on Pluto and Charon.

Ice VII may comprise the ocean floor of Europa as well as extrasolar planets (such as Awohali, and Enaiposha) that are largely made of water.

Small domains of ice XI could exist in the atmospheres of Jupiter and Saturn as well. The fact that small domains of ice XI can exist at temperatures up to 111 K has some scientists speculating that it may be fairly common in interstellar space, with small 'nucleation seeds' spreading through space and converting regular ice, much like the fabled ice-nine mentioned in Vonnegut's Cat's Cradle. The possible roles of ice XI in interstellar space and planet formation have been the subject of several research papers. Until observational confirmation of ice XI in outer space is made, the presence of ice XI in space remains controversial owing to the aforementioned criticism raised by Iitaka. The infrared absorption spectra of ice XI was studied in 2009 in preparation for searches for ice XI in space.

It is theorized that the ice giant planets Uranus and Neptune hold a layer of superionic water. Machine learning and free-energy methods predict close-packed superionic phases to be stable over a wide temperature and pressure range, and a body-centred cubic superionic phase to be kinetically favoured, but stable over a small window of parameters. On the other hand, there are also studies that suggest that other elements present inside the interiors of these planets, particularly carbon, may prevent the formation of superionic water.
