= Clathrate compound =

Inclusion compound

A clathrate or clathrate compound is a type of inclusion compound in which a guest atom, ion, or molecule is enclosed in a cage-like cavity formed by a host molecule or by an extended host lattice. The term is derived from the Latin clatratus, meaning 'with bars' or 'latticed'. According to the International Union of Pure and Applied Chemistry (IUPAC), clathrates are inclusion compounds "in which the guest molecule is in a cage formed by the host molecule or by a lattice of host molecules".

Clathrates occur in several areas of chemistry and materials science. In clathrate hydrates, water molecules form hydrogen-bonded cages that can trap small gases such as methane, carbon dioxide, nitrogen, or hydrogen sulfide. In organic and supramolecular chemistry, hosts such as hydroquinone, urea, thiourea, cyclodextrins, calixarenes, and Dianin's compound can form inclusion compounds with suitable guest molecules. In solid-state chemistry, inorganic clathrates are extended covalent frameworks, commonly based on group 14 elements such as silicon, germanium, or tin, that enclose guest atoms in polyhedral cages.

The properties of a clathrate depend on both the host framework and the guest species. Guest atoms or molecules may stabilize a framework, occupy only some cages, influence phase stability, scatter phonons, or provide charge balance. Clathrates are therefore relevant to host–guest chemistry, methane hydrates, gas storage and separation, thermoelectric materials, superconductivity, and synthetic phases formed under unusual or extreme conditions.

== Terminology and history ==
IUPAC definition

clathrates: Inclusion compounds in which the guest molecule is in a cage formed by the host molecule or by a lattice of host molecules.

It was previously thought that chlorine was solid at temperatures near and above 0 °C, but in 1810, Humphry Davy discovered that in fact, chlorine gas compounds with water to form a solid. He coined the phrase "gas hydrate" for his discovery. Michael Faraday later determined a composition of 1:10 chlorine/water.

The apparatus developed by Cailletet in 1878 allowed research of matter in high-pressure and low-temperature conditions. This started a line of research mapping out the thermodynamic phase diagrams of clathrates. Villard performed stoichiometry of some small-molecule hydrates, and suggested that all hydrates have 6 hydrogens per complex.

Later investigators discovered that certain inclusion compounds are special, in that the host-chemical forms a crystal, while this is not so for other inclusion compounds. The word "clathrate" was coined by Herbert Marcus Powell in 1948. Several papers submitted in 1951 all found the Structure I of clathrates, using theory and X-ray crystallography.

== Structure and types ==
Clathrate hydrate cages. The 5^{12} dodecahedral and 5^{12}6^{2} tetrakaidecahedral cages occur in structure I hydrates.

Clathrates consist of a host framework and guest species. The host framework defines cavities or cages, while the guest species occupy those cavities. In many clathrates the guest is not strongly bonded to the framework, but interacts through van der Waals forces, hydrogen bonding, electrostatic interactions, or weak covalent interactions. The presence, size, and occupancy of guest species can determine whether a clathrate framework is stable.

The cages of many clathrate structures are described by the number and type of faces in their coordination polyhedra. Common cage types include 5^{12}, a cage with twelve pentagonal faces; 5^{12}6^{2}, with twelve pentagonal and two hexagonal faces; and 5^{12}6^{4}, with twelve pentagonal and four hexagonal faces.

=== Clathrate hydrates ===
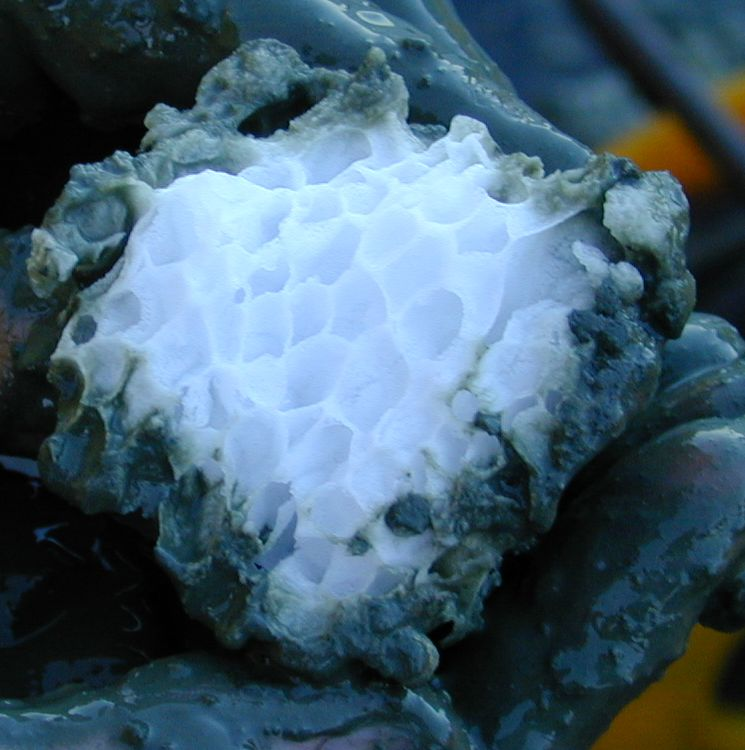
Methane clathrate embedded in sediment from Hydrate Ridge off the coast of Oregon, United States.

Clathrate hydrates, also called gas hydrates, are water-based crystalline solids in which guest molecules occupy cages formed by hydrogen-bonded water molecules. The guests are commonly small gases or volatile molecules, including methane, carbon dioxide, nitrogen, oxygen, hydrogen sulfide, noble gases, and light hydrocarbons. Some polar molecules with large hydrophobic groups can also form hydrates. Without suitable guest molecules, most hydrate frameworks are unstable relative to ordinary ice or liquid water.

Clathrate hydrates are commonly classified into three structure types: structure I (sI), structure II (sII), and structure H (sH). Structure I hydrates contain 46 water molecules per unit cell, arranged as two small 5^{12} cages and six larger 5^{12}6^{2} cages. Structure II hydrates contain 136 water molecules per unit cell, with sixteen 5^{12} cages and eight 5^{12}6^{4} cages. Structure H hydrates contain 34 water molecules per unit cell and three cage types; they usually require both small guest molecules and larger helper guests for stability.

Methane hydrates occur naturally in marine sediments, deep-lake sediments, and permafrost regions, where low temperature and high pressure favour hydrate stability. They are of interest as a potential energy resource, as part of the carbon cycle, and as a geohazard because hydrate dissociation can affect sediment stability and release methane.

=== Inorganic clathrates ===
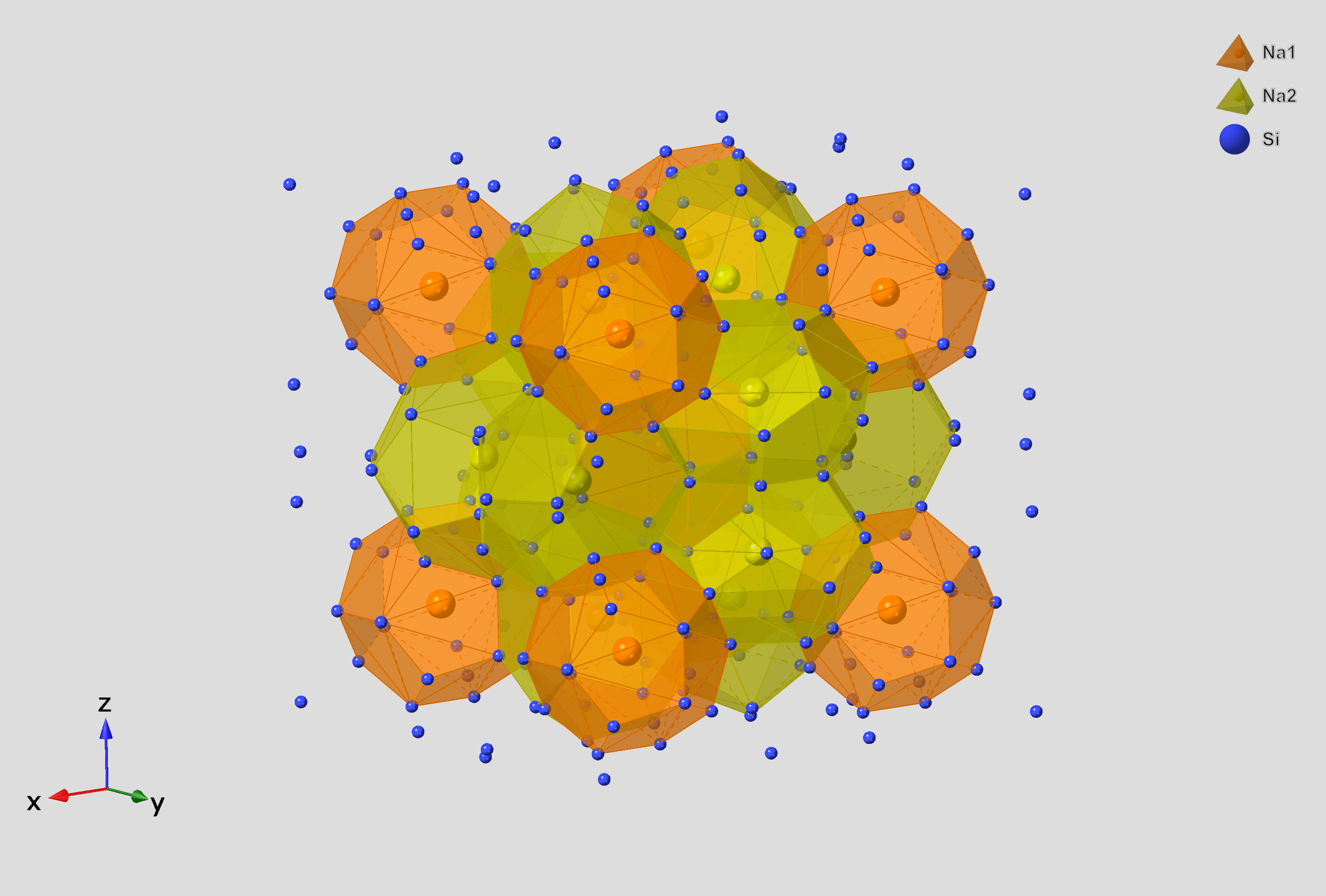
Crystal structure of Na_{8}Si_{46}, a type-I inorganic clathrate with sodium atoms in silicon cages.

Inorganic clathrates are crystalline solids with covalently bonded frameworks that enclose guest atoms or ions. Many contain silicon, germanium, or tin frameworks with alkali-metal, alkaline-earth-metal, or rare-earth guests.

Many inorganic clathrates are Zintl or Zintl-like phases. A common type-I inorganic clathrate has the idealized formula A_{8}E_{46}, where A is a guest atom and E is a framework element such as silicon, germanium, or tin.

A notable feature of many inorganic clathrates is low lattice thermal conductivity. This is often associated with the motion of guest atoms inside oversized framework cages, sometimes described as "rattling". Such motion can scatter phonons while leaving electronic transport through the framework relatively less affected, making some inorganic clathrates candidates for thermoelectric materials.

== Formation and stability ==
The conditions under which a clathrate forms depend on both the thermodynamics of the host–guest system and the kinetics of nucleation and crystal growth. In clathrate hydrates, stability is commonly represented by pressure–temperature phase boundaries that vary with guest composition, salinity, and the presence of thermodynamic promoters or inhibitors.

=== Natural and extreme-condition occurrence ===
Clathrate phases are discussed in planetary science and astrochemistry because water ice and volatile molecules are common in the outer Solar System and in cold astrophysical environments. At the very high pressures found in giant-planet interiors, cage clathrates collapse into denser "filled ice" phases in which the guest molecules occupy channels or voids within a distorted ice lattice. Filled-ice hydrates of both hydrogen and methane have been observed to survive to pressures of tens to nearly a hundred gigapascals — a hydrogen-filled cubic ice phase with a 2:1 hydrogen-to-water ratio has been reported up to 90 GPa, while a methane-filled hexagonal ice phase remains stable up to at least 150 GPa.

A calcium–copper–silicon type-I inorganic clathrate has been identified in red trinitite formed during the 1945 Trinity nuclear test.

== Applications ==
Clathrates have been explored for gas storage, gas separation, carbon dioxide capture and sequestration, desalination, refrigeration and cooling, thermoelectric energy conversion, photovoltaics, batteries, and superconducting materials.

== Examples ==
- Methane clathrate is a clathrate hydrate in which methane occupies cages in a hydrogen-bonded water framework.
- Noble gases such as Xenon and Argon form hydrate or hydroquinone clathrates.
- Hofmann clathrates are cyanometallate coordination polymers that include small aromatic guests.
- Na_{8}Si_{46} is a type-I inorganic clathrate in which sodium atoms occupy cages in a silicon framework.
- A Ca–Cu–Si type-I clathrate has been identified in red trinitite from the Trinity nuclear test.

== See also ==
- Clathrate hydrate
- Host–guest chemistry
- Inclusion compound
- Metal–organic framework
- Supramolecular chemistry
- Thermoelectric materials
- Zeolite
- Zintl phase
