= Clathrate hydrate =

Crystalline solid containing molecules caged in a lattice of frozen water

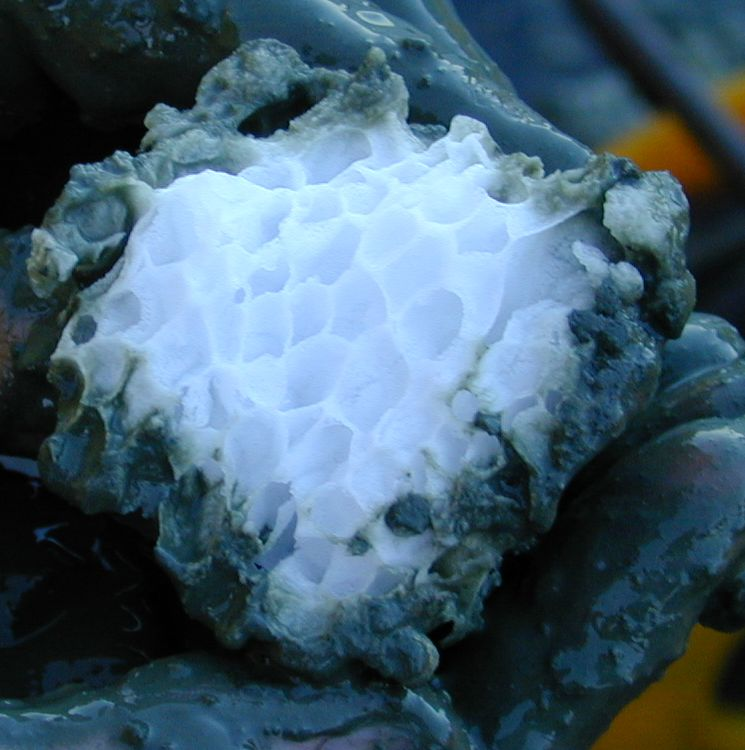
Methane clathrate block embedded in the sediment of hydrate ridge, off Oregon, USA

Clathrate hydrates, or gas hydrates, clathrates, or hydrates, are crystalline water-based solids physically resembling ice, in which small non-polar molecules (typically gases) or polar molecules with large hydrophobic moieties are trapped inside "cages" of hydrogen-bonded, frozen water molecules. In other words, clathrate hydrates are clathrate compounds in which the host molecule is water and the guest molecule is typically a gas or liquid. Without the support of the trapped molecules, the lattice structure of hydrate clathrates would collapse into conventional ice crystal structure or liquid water. Most low molecular weight gases, including O_{2}, H_{2}, N_{2}, CO_{2}, CH_{4}, H_{2}S, Ar, Kr, Xe, and Cl_{2} as well as some higher hydrocarbons and freons, will form hydrates at suitable temperatures and pressures. Clathrate hydrates are not officially chemical compounds, as the enclathrated guest molecules are never bonded to the lattice. The formation and decomposition of clathrate hydrates are first order phase transitions, not chemical reactions. Their detailed formation and decomposition mechanisms on a molecular level are still not well understood. Clathrate hydrates were first documented in 1810 by Sir Humphry Davy who found that water was a primary component of what was earlier thought to be solidified chlorine.

Clathrates have been found to occur naturally in large quantities. Around 6.4 trillion (6.4×10^{12}) tonnes of methane is trapped in deposits of methane clathrate on the deep ocean floor. Such deposits can be found on the Norwegian continental shelf in the northern headwall flank of the Storegga Slide. Clathrates can also exist as permafrost, as at the Mallik gas hydrate site in the Mackenzie Delta of northwestern Canadian Arctic. These natural gas hydrates are seen as a potentially vast energy resource and several countries have dedicated national programs to develop this energy resource. Clathrate hydrate has also been of great interest as technology enabler for many applications like seawater desalination, gas storage, carbon dioxide capture & storage, cooling medium for data centres and district cooling, etc. Hydrocarbon clathrates cause problems for the petroleum industry, because they can form inside gas pipelines, often resulting in obstructions. Deep sea deposition of carbon dioxide clathrate has been proposed as a method to remove this greenhouse gas from the atmosphere and control climate change. Clathrates are suspected to occur in large quantities on some outer planets, moons and trans-Neptunian objects, binding gas at fairly high temperatures.

== History and etymology ==
Clathrate hydrates were discovered in 1810 by Humphry Davy. Clathrates were studied by P. Pfeiffer in 1927 and in 1930, E. Hertel defined "molecular compounds" as substances decomposed into individual components following the mass action law in solution or gas state. Clathrate hydrates were discovered to form blockages in gas pipelines in 1934 by Hammerschmidt that led to increase in research to avoid hydrate formation. In 1945, H. M. Powell analyzed the crystal structure of these compounds and named them clathrates. Gas production through methane hydrates has since been realized and has been tested for energy production in Japan and China.

The word clathrate is derived from the Latin clathratus (clatratus), meaning 'with bars, latticed'.

== Structure ==
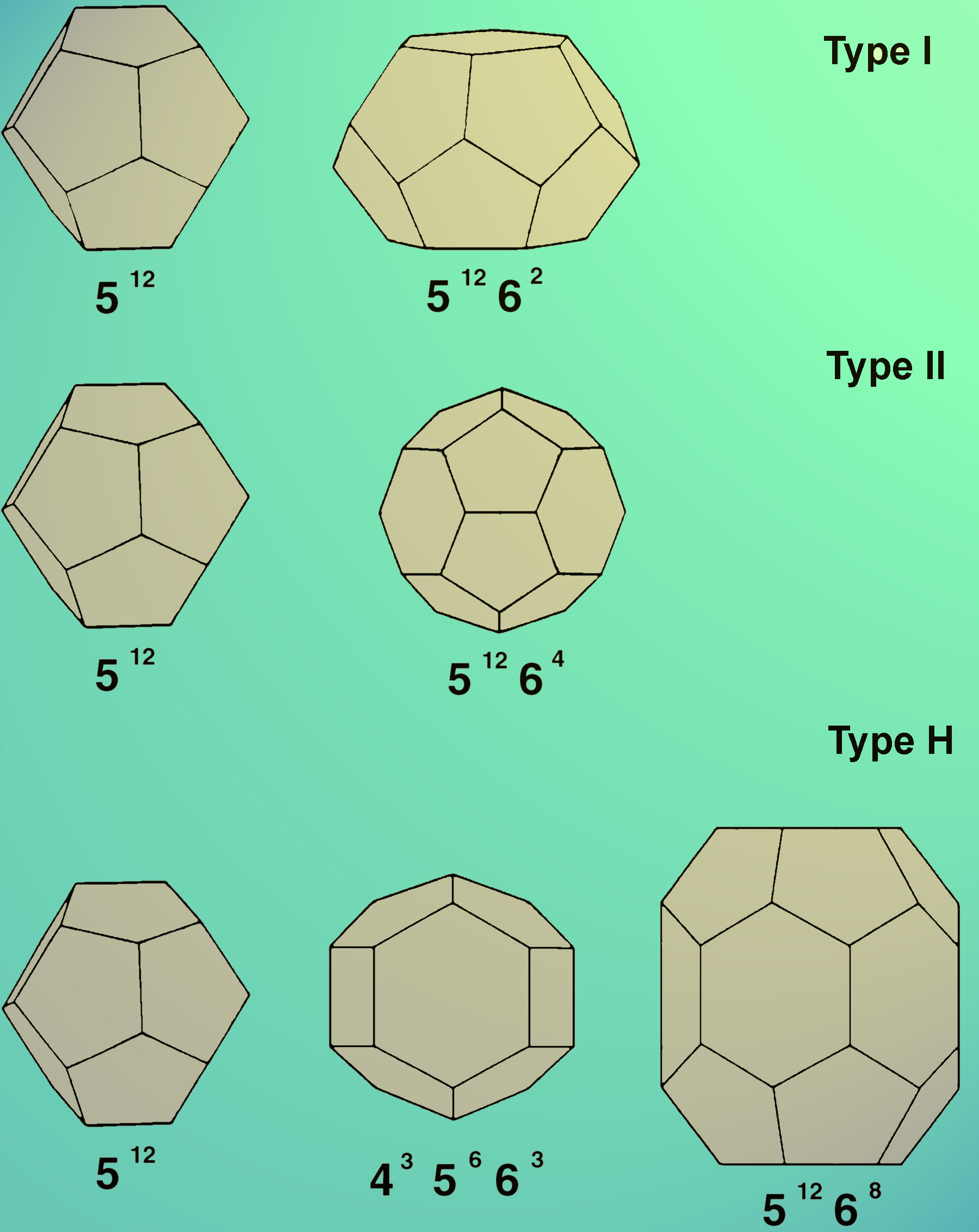
Cages building the different gas hydrate structures

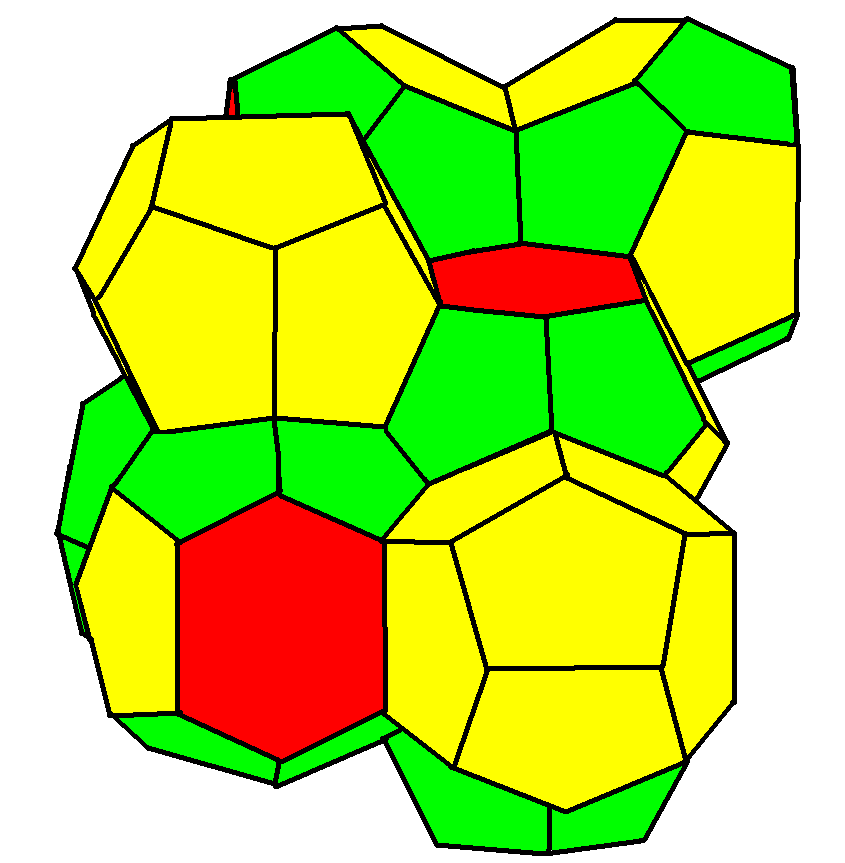
Weaire–Phelan structure.

Gas hydrates usually form two crystallographic cubic structures: structure (Type) I (named sI) and structure (Type) II (named sII) of space groups $Pm\overline{3}n$ and $Fd\overline{3}m$ respectively. A third hexagonal structure of space group $P6/mmm$ may also be observed (Type H).

The unit cell of Type I consists of 46 water molecules, forming two types of cages – small and large. The unit cell contains two small cages and six large ones. The small cage has the shape of an irregular dodecahedron (5^{12}), specifically a pyritohedron, and the large one that of a tetradecahedron, specifically a hexagonal truncated trapezohedron (5^{12}6^{2}). Together, they form a version of the Weaire–Phelan structure. Typical guests forming Type I hydrates are CO_{2} in carbon dioxide clathrate and CH_{4} in methane clathrate.

The unit cell of Type II consists of 136 water molecules, again forming two types of cages – small and large. In this case there are sixteen small cages and eight large ones in the unit cell. The small cage again has the shape of a pentagonal dodecahedron (5^{12}), but the large one is a hexadecahedron (5^{12}6^{4}), specifically a truncated triakis tetrahedron. Type II hydrates are formed by gases like O_{2} and N_{2}.

The unit cell of Type H consists of 34 water molecules, forming three types of cages – two small ones of different types, and one "huge". In this case, the unit cell consists of three small cages of type 5^{12}, two small ones of type 4^{3}5^{6}6^{3} and one huge of type 5^{12}6^{8}. The formation of Type H requires the cooperation of two guest gases (large and small) to be stable. It is the large cavity that allows structure H hydrates to fit in large molecules (e.g. butane, hydrocarbons), given the presence of other smaller help gases to fill and support the remaining cavities. Structure H hydrates were suggested to exist in the Gulf of Mexico. Thermogenically produced supplies of heavy hydrocarbons are common there.

At pressures above roughly 1–2 GPa, clathrate cage structures collapse into denser "filled ice" phases, in which guest molecules occupy channels within a distorted ice lattice rather than discrete cages. Methane hydrate, for example, transforms above 2 GPa into an orthorhombic phase (MH-III) with a water framework resembling ice Ih, and Raman spectroscopy and ab initio simulations have shown that a further, denser filled-ice phase (MH-IV), based more closely on the ice Ih structure, forms near 40 GPa and remains stable to at least 150 GPa — the highest pressure at which any gas hydrate has been observed to persist.

The molar fraction of water of most clathrate hydrates is 85%. Clathrate hydrates are derived from organic hydrogen-bonded frameworks. These frameworks are prepared from molecules that "self-associate" by multiple hydrogen-bonding interactions. Small molecules or gases (i.e. methane, carbon dioxide, hydrogen) can be encaged as a guest in hydrates. The ideal guest/host ratio for clathrate hydrates range from 0.8 to 0.9. The guest interaction with the host is limited to van der Waals forces. Certain exceptions exist in semiclathrates where guests incorporate into the host structure via hydrogen bonding with the host structure. Hydrates form often with partial guest filling and collapse in the absence of guests occupying the water cages. Like ice, clathrate hydrates are stable at low temperatures and high pressure and possess similar properties like electrical resistivity. Clathrate hydrates are naturally occurring and can be found in the permafrost and oceanic sediments. Hydrates can also be synthesized through seed crystallization or using amorphous precursors for nucleation.

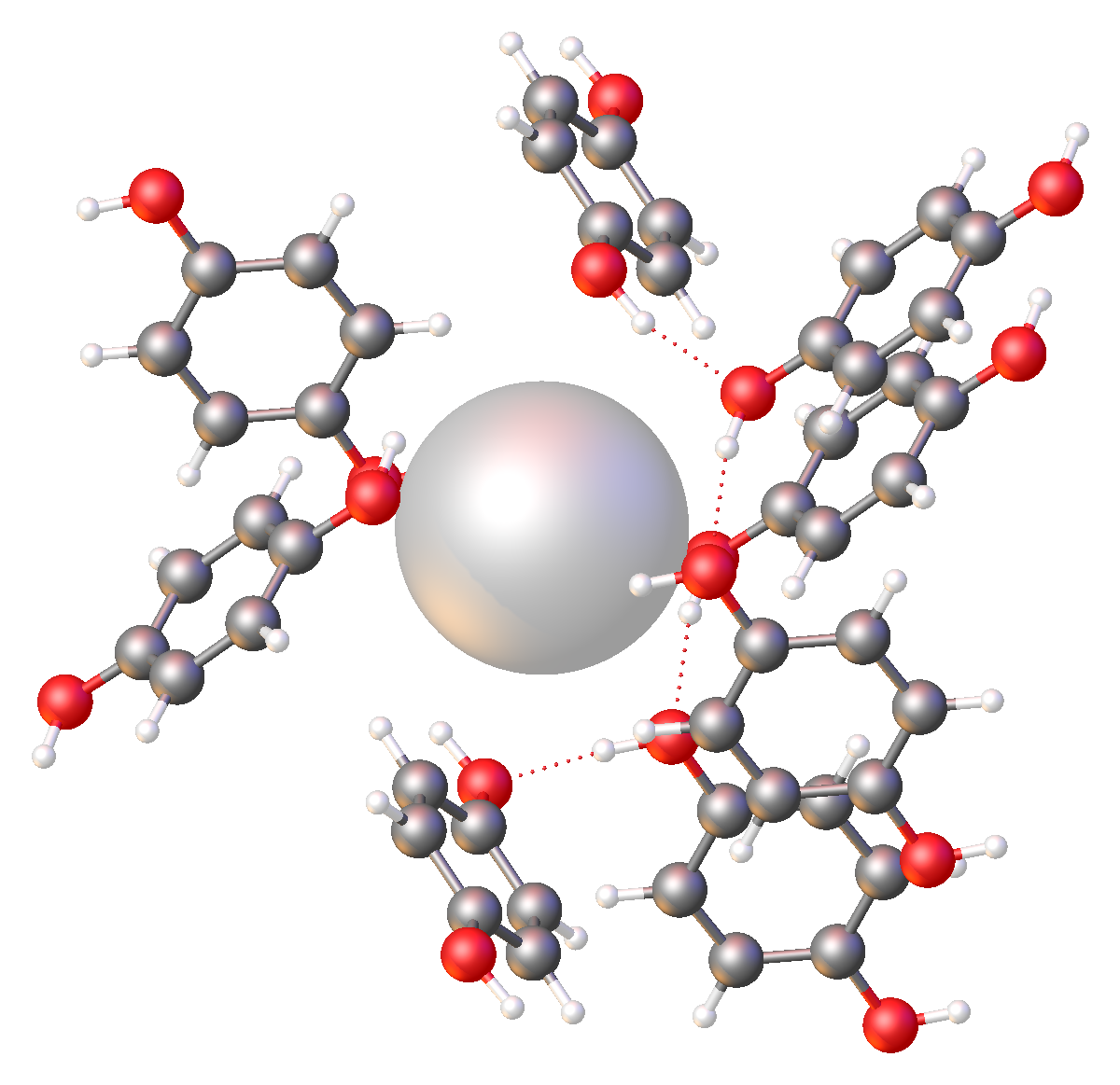
Portion of the lattice of the clathrate xenon-quinol.

Clathrates have been explored for many applications including: gas storage, gas production, gas separation, desalination, thermoelectrics, photovoltaics, and batteries.

== Hydrates on Earth ==
=== Natural gas hydrates ===
Naturally on Earth gas hydrates can be found on the seabed, in ocean sediments, in deep lake sediments (e.g. Lake Baikal), as well as in the permafrost regions. The amount of methane potentially trapped in natural methane hydrate deposits may be significant (10^{15} to 10^{17} cubic metres), which makes them of major interest as a potential energy resource. Catastrophic release of methane from the decomposition of such deposits may lead to a global climate change, referred to as the "clathrate gun hypothesis", because CH_{4} is a more potent greenhouse gas than CO_{2} (see Atmospheric methane). The fast decomposition of such deposits is considered a geohazard, due to its potential to trigger landslides, earthquakes and tsunamis. However, natural gas hydrates do not contain only methane but also other hydrocarbon gases, as well as H_{2}S and CO_{2}. Air hydrates are frequently observed in polar ice samples.

Pingos are common structures in permafrost regions. Similar structures are found in deep water related to methane vents. Significantly, gas hydrates can even be formed in the absence of a liquid phase. Under that situation, water is dissolved in gas or in liquid hydrocarbon phase.

In 2017, both Japan and China announced that attempts at large-scale resource extraction of methane hydrates from under the seafloor were successful. However, commercial-scale production remains years away.

The 2020 Research Fronts report identified gas hydrate accumulation and mining technology as one of the top 10 research fronts in the geosciences.

=== Gas hydrates in pipelines ===
Thermodynamic conditions favouring hydrate formation are often found in pipelines. This is highly undesirable, because the clathrate crystals might agglomerate and plug the line and cause flow assurance failure and damage valves and instrumentation. The results can range from flow reduction to equipment damage.

==== Hydrate formation, prevention and mitigation philosophy ====
Hydrates have a strong tendency to agglomerate and to adhere to the pipe wall and thereby plug the pipeline. Once formed, they can be decomposed by increasing the temperature and/or decreasing the pressure. Even under these conditions, the clathrate dissociation is a slow process.

Therefore, preventing hydrate formation appears to be the key to the problem. A hydrate prevention philosophy could typically be based on three levels of security, listed in order of priority:

1. Avoid operational conditions that might cause formation of hydrates by depressing the hydrate formation temperature using glycol dehydration;
2. Temporarily change operating conditions in order to avoid hydrate formation;
3. Prevent formation of hydrates by addition of chemicals that (a) shift the hydrate equilibrium conditions towards lower temperatures and higher pressures or (b) increase hydrate formation time (inhibitors)

The actual philosophy would depend on operational circumstances such as pressure, temperature, type of flow (gas, liquid, presences of water etc.).

==== Hydrate inhibitors ====
When operating within a set of parameters where hydrates could be formed, there are still ways to avoid their formation. Altering the gas composition by adding chemicals can lower the hydrate formation temperature and/or delay their formation. Two options generally exist:

- Thermodynamic inhibitors
- Kinetic inhibitors and anti-agglomerants

The most common thermodynamic inhibitors are methanol, monoethylene glycol (MEG), and diethylene glycol (DEG), commonly referred to as glycol. All may be recovered and recirculated, but the economics of methanol recovery is not favourable in most cases. MEG is preferred over DEG for applications where the temperature is expected to be −10 °C or lower due to high viscosity at low temperatures. Triethylene glycol (TEG) has too low vapour pressure to be suited as an inhibitor injected into a gas stream. More methanol is lost in the gas phase when compared to MEG or DEG.

The use of kinetic inhibitors and anti-agglomerants in actual field operations is a new and evolving technology. It requires extensive tests and optimisation to the actual system. While kinetic inhibitors work by slowing down the kinetics of the nucleation, anti-agglomerants do not stop the nucleation, but stop the agglomeration (sticking together) of gas hydrate crystals. These two kinds of inhibitors are also known as low dosage hydrate inhibitors, because they require much smaller concentrations than the conventional thermodynamic inhibitors. Kinetic inhibitors, which do not require water and hydrocarbon mixture to be effective, are usually polymers or copolymers and anti-agglomerants (requires water and hydrocarbon mixture) are polymers or zwitterionic – usually ammonium and COOH – surfactants being both attracted to hydrates and hydrocarbons.

== Empty clathrate hydrates ==
Empty clathrate hydrates are thermodynamically unstable (guest molecules are of paramount importance to stabilize these structures) with respect to ice, and as such their study using experimental techniques is greatly limited to very specific formation conditions; however, their mechanical stability renders theoretical and computer simulation methods the ideal choice to address their thermodynamic properties. Starting from very cold samples (110–145 K), Falenty et al. degassed Ne–sII clathrates for several hours using vacuum pumping to obtain a so-called ice XVI, while employing neutron diffraction to observe that (i) the empty sII hydrate structure decomposes at T ≥ 145 K and, furthermore, (ii) the empty hydrate shows a negative thermal expansion at T < 55 K, and it is mechanically more stable and has a larger lattice constant at low temperatures than the Ne-filled analogue. The existence of such a porous ice had been theoretically predicted before. From a theoretical perspective, empty hydrates can be probed using Molecular Dynamics or Monte Carlo techniques. Conde et al. used empty hydrates and a fully atomic description of the solid lattice to estimate the phase diagram of H_{2}O at negative pressures and T ≤ 300 K, and obtain the differences in chemical potentials between ice Ih and the empty hydrates, central to the van der Waals−Platteeuw theory. Jacobson et al. performed simulations using a monoatomic (coarse-grained) model developed for H_{2}O that is capable of capturing the tetrahedral symmetry of hydrates. Their calculations revealed that, under 1 atm pressure, sI and sII empty hydrates are metastable regarding the ice phases up to their melting temperatures, T = 245 ± 2 K and T = 252 ± 2 K, respectively. Matsui et al. employed molecular dynamics to perform a thorough and systematic study of several ice polymorphs, namely space fullerene ices, zeolitic ices, and aeroices, and interpreted their relative stability in terms of geometrical considerations.

The thermodynamics of metastable empty sI clathrate hydrates have been probed over broad temperature and pressure ranges, 100 K ≤ T ≤ 220 K and 100 kPa ≤ p ≤ 500 MPa, by Cruz et al. using large-scale simulations and compared with experimental data at 100 kPa. The whole p–V–T surface obtained was fitted by the universal form of the Parsafar and Mason equation of state with an accuracy of 99.7–99.9%. Framework deformation caused by applied temperature followed a parabolic law, and there is a critical temperature above which the isobaric thermal expansion becomes negative, ranging from 194.7 K at 100 kPa to 166.2 K at 500 MPa. Response to the applied (p, T) field was analyzed in terms of angle and distance descriptors of a classical tetrahedral structure and observed to occur essentially by means of angular alteration for (p, T) > (200 MPa, 200 K). The length of the hydrogen bonds responsible for framework integrity was insensitive to the thermodynamic conditions and its average value is r(̅O H) = 0.25 nm.

Guest molecule mobility at the boundary between coexisting hydrate structures has also been found to be unusually fast. In high-pressure methane hydrate samples containing a metastable mixture of structure I and structure II domains, quasielastic neutron scattering measurements showed methane diffusing at the structural interface several orders of magnitude faster than the well-established cage-to-cage hopping mechanism within a single clathrate structure, a mobility comparable to or exceeding that of methane in the pure supercritical fluid at the same conditions.

== CO_{2} hydrate ==
Clathrate hydrate, which encaged CO_{2} as guest molecule is termed as CO_{2} hydrate. The term CO_{2} hydrates are more commonly used these days with its relevance in anthropogenic CO_{2} capture and sequestration. A nonstoichiometric compound, carbon dioxide hydrate, is composed of hydrogen-bonded water molecules arranged in ice-like frameworks that are occupied by molecules with appropriate sizes and regions. In structure I, the CO_{2} hydrate crystallizes as one of two cubic hydrates composed of 46 H_{2}O molecules (or D_{2}O) and eight CO_{2} molecules occupying both large cavities (tetrakaidecahedral) and small cavities (pentagonal dodecahedral). Researchers believed that oceans and permafrost have immense potential to capture anthropogenic CO_{2} in the form CO_{2} hydrates. The utilization of additives to shift the CO_{2} hydrate equilibrium curve in phase diagram towards higher temperature and lower pressures is still under scrutiny to make extensive large-scale storage of CO_{2} viable in shallower subsea depths.

== See also ==
- Clathrate
- Clathrate gun hypothesis
- Gas hydrate pingo
- Flow Assurance
- MEG Reclamation
- Star formation and evolution
