= Talik (disambiguation) =

Talik is a layer of year-round unfrozen ground that lies in permafrost areas.

Talik may also refer to:

- A nickname of Israel Tal, Israeli general
- Tâlik, Turkish simplification of the Nastaʿlīq script
- Taʿlīq script
