= Gas emission crater =

Crater formed by permafrost gas release

A gas emissions crater or GEC is a crater that is left by an explosion that is believed to be caused by an overheated buildup of gas stuck below a layer of permafrost. The gas is primarily methane (also known as "natural gas") and is generally believed by experts to have seeped up from large underground reserves toward the Earth's surface "through some kind of geological fault," getting trapped when they reach the bottom of the permafrost. First known to have occurred in 2013, they are occurring solely in Siberia, where there are large stores of natural gas below a melting surface layer of permafrost. They are believed to be a byproduct of global climate change, since the warming of Siberia's climate weakens the permafrost enough to allow a sub-surface methane buildup to cause an outburst. The release of this previously trapped methane into the atmosphere is also likely to increase the speed of global climate change.

Gas emission craters were first spotted in 2013; later satellite analysis has indicated that it was formed sometime between October 9 and November 1, 2013. Most famously, the discovery of the Yamal crater in 2014 quickly drew the attention of world media. As of 2020, there were 17 known gas emissions craters, all of which are in the circumpolar regions of Western Siberia, on either the Yamal Peninsula or the neighboring Gydan Peninsula, which both sit atop large underground methane reserves. They are variously located on land as well as at the bottom of rivers and lakes. Soon after their discovery, the term "gas emissions crater" was proposed and subsequently accepted by the scientific community.

== Cause ==
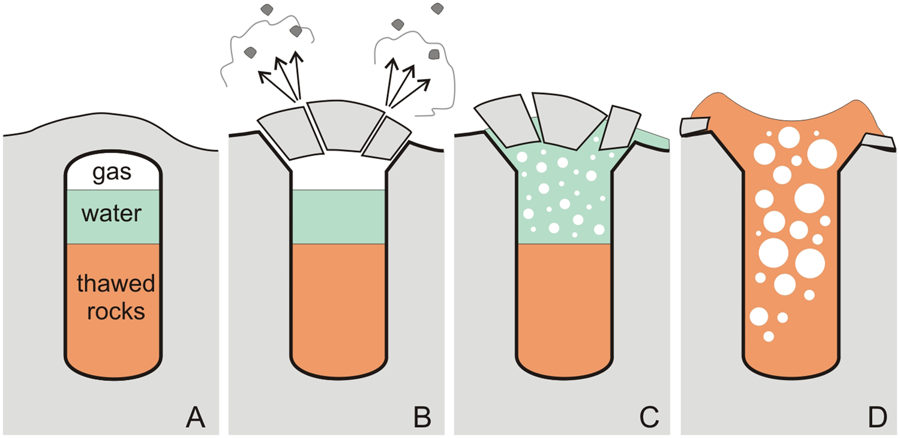
Cryovolcanism on the Earth

Initially, with the sudden global fame of the Yamal crater, various hypotheses of its origin were put forward, including military tests, meteorite impact, UFOs, or the collapse of an underground gas facility. Later, in September 2018, a group of researchers from Moscow State University published an article in the journal Scientific Reports that claimed that the Yamal crater was the first cryovolcano discovered on Earth.

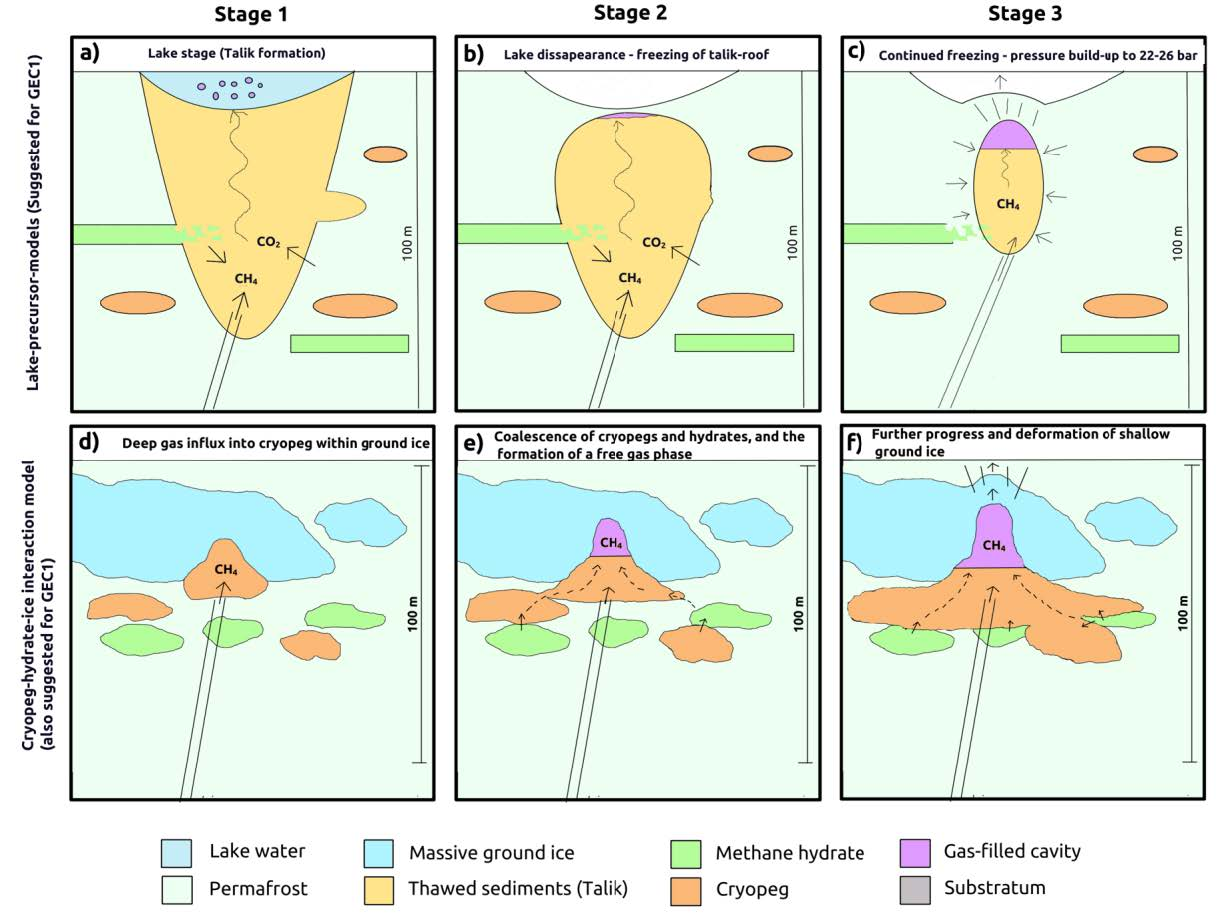
A summary of the suggested two groups of models for the GECs formation

Subsequently, however, in the course of scientific research, the scientific community has come to the general conclusion that the crater was formed as a result of the so-called gas release – an underground explosion of methane hydrates which ejects into the air all the rock and soil above it (along with releasing the methane itself). More specifically, their formation most likely occurs under the influence of fluid-dynamic processes in permafrost, which lead to the appearance of zones of accumulation of free natural gas near the surface. In this case, when the reservoir pressure of the accumulated gas fluids exceeds the pressure of the overlying strata, an avalanche-like outburst of gas-saturated rocks may occur. While thawing can promote methane release it has also been suggested that surface ice-melt water can migrate downward propelled by osmotic pressure associated to the concentration difference with a cryopeg, a lens of high-salinity water below, working as a mechanism for the accumulation of overpressure driving explosions.

== See also ==
- Arctic methane emissions
- Hydrothermal explosion
- Talik – Permanently-thawed zone amid a permafrost area
- Yamal Peninsula § Yamal craters
- Yamal crater – an extensive article on the phenomenon in the Russian-language Wikipedia
- Pingo – Mound of earth-covered ice
