= Ice wedge =

Crack in the ground formed by a narrow vertical block of ice

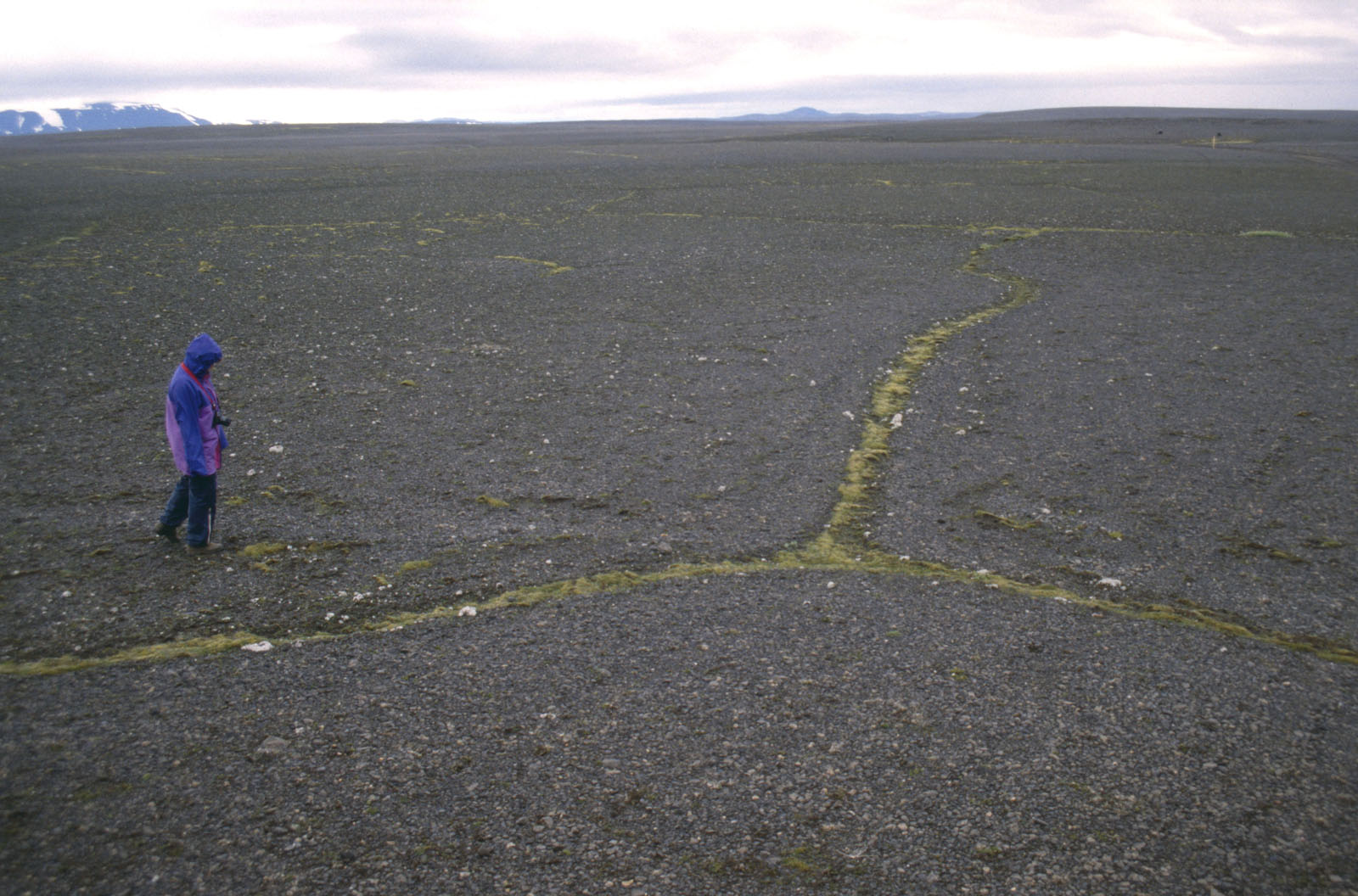
Ice wedges in Sprengisandur, Iceland

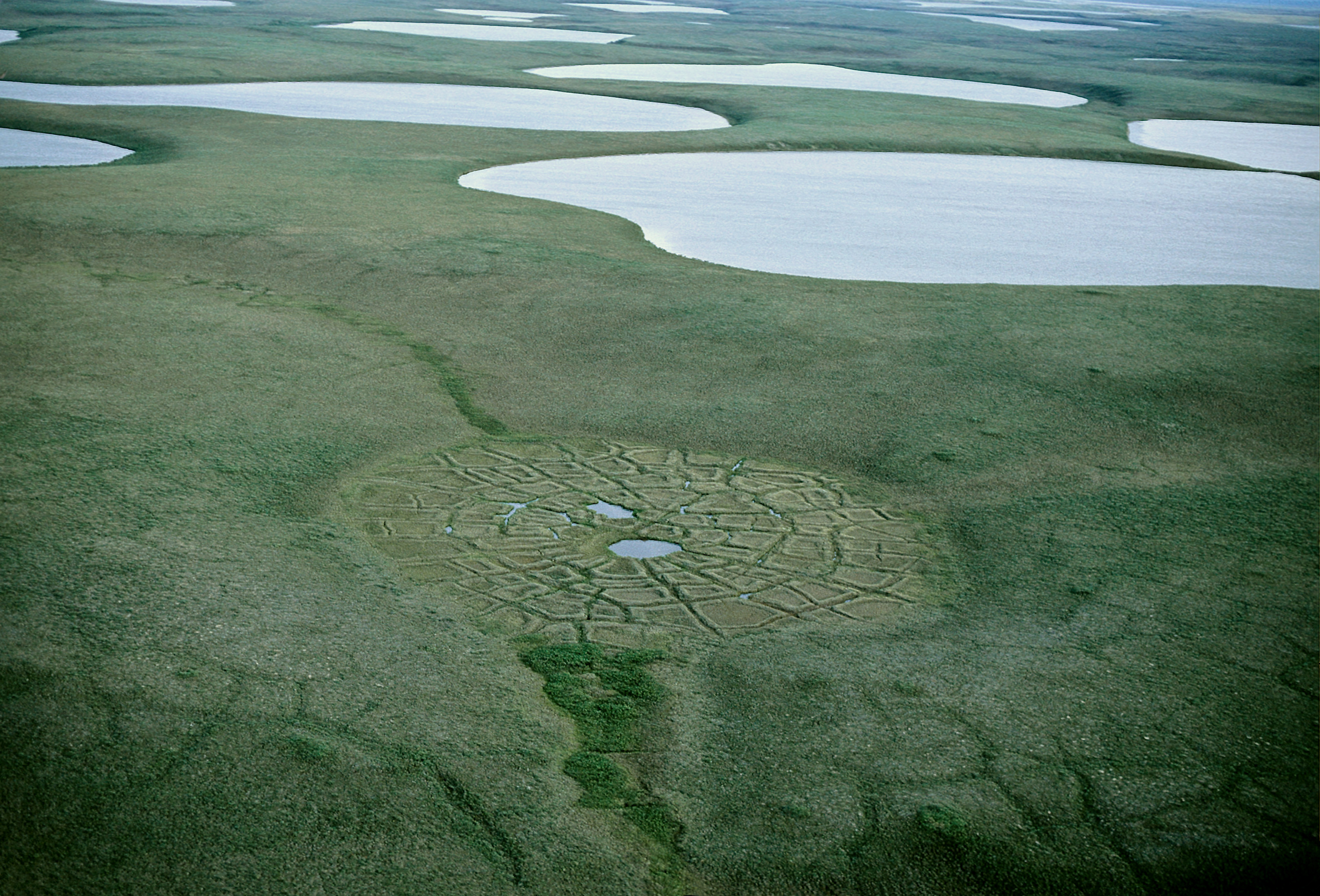
Lakes in the Mackenzie delta. In the foreground, a drained lake shows large, low-centered ice-wedge polygons

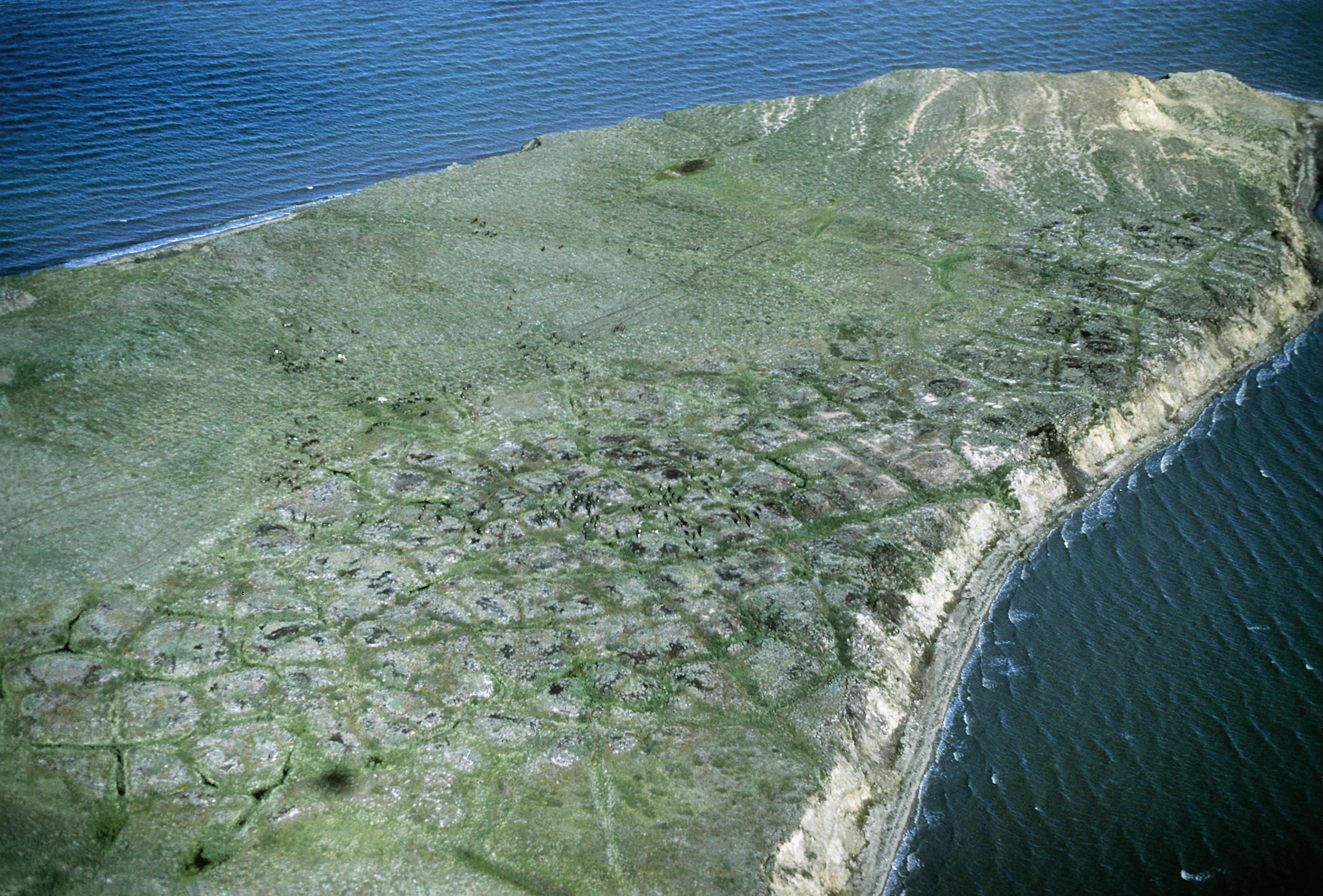
Peninsula at the coast of the Arctic Ocean in the Mackenzie Delta area showing well developed ice-wedge polygons. A Caribou herd is grazing on it.

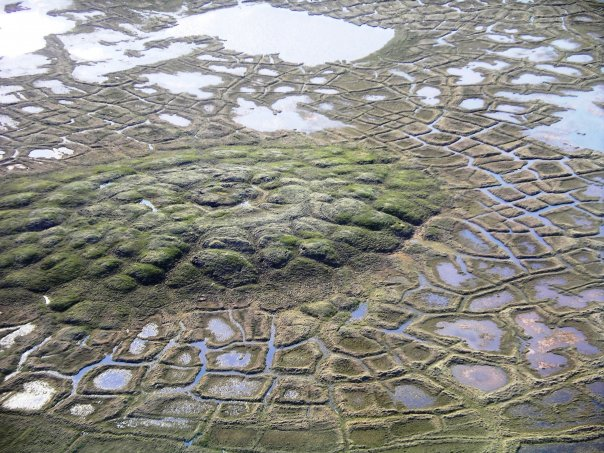
A melting pingo with surrounding ice wedge polygons near Tuktoyaktuk, Canada

Ice wedge exposed by erosion along the Beaufort Sea coast, Canada. The wedge formed by thermal contraction of the ground which opened a crack in winter. The crack filled with meltwater in the spring which then froze in the permafrost, causing the thin vertical lines of ice and sediment that form the wedge itself.

An ice wedge is a crack in the ground formed by a narrow or thin piece of ice that measures up to 3–4 meters in length at ground level and extends downwards into the ground up to several meters. During the winter months, the water in the ground freezes and expands. Once temperatures reach −17 degrees Celsius or lower, the ice that has already formed acts like a solid and expands to form cracks in the surface known as ice wedges. As this process continues over many years ice wedges can grow, up to the size of a swimming pool. Ice wedges usually appear in a polygonal pattern known as ice wedge polygons. The cracks can also be filled with materials other than ice, especially sand, and are then called sand wedges.

== Formation ==
There are many theories that attempt to explain the origin of ice wedges but only one has been consistently supported by most prominent scientists: the thermal contraction theory.

=== Thermal contraction theory ===
The thermal contraction theory posits that during the winter months, thermal contraction cracks form only a few cm wide and a couple of metres deep because of the extreme cold weather. Over the next few months, the snow melts and the remaining water fills the cracks and the permafrost below the surface freezes it. These tiny cracks turn into permafrost. Once the summer months arrive, the permafrost expands; horizontal compression produces upturning of the frozen sediment by plastic deformation. The next winter the cold refreezes and cracks the already forming ice wedge, opening a way for the melting snow of spring to fill the empty crack. The mean annual air temperature thought needed to form ice wedges is −6° to −8 °C or colder.

== Forms ==
There are three different forms of ice wedges: active, inactive and casts. All three forms are prevalent today and can be found in different parts of the world.

=== Active ===
Active ice wedges are those that are still evolving and growing. During each year, a layer of ice will be added if cracking occurs, but cracking need not occur every year to be considered active. The area in which most ice wedges remain active is along the permafrost zone. The number of active ice wedges that are cracking yearly is consistently declining as they become inactive.

=== Inactive ===
Inactive ice wedges are wedges that are no longer cracking and growing. Throughout the winter months, the wedge does not split and therefore in the summer no new water is added.

=== Casts ===
In areas of past permafrost, ice wedges have melted and are no longer filled with ice. The wedge, which is now empty, is filled with sediment and dirt from the surrounding walls. These are called ice wedge casts and can be used to estimate the climate of hundreds of thousands of years ago.

== Types ==
Ice wedges have historically been classified into two main categories: epigenetic and syngenetic. The type of an ice wedges refer to the way in which the wedge grows over time. Relatively recent field studies have revealed a new type of ice wedge: anti-syngenetic. Currently, these are the only three distinctly classified types of ice wedges observed in nature. The differences among the growth patterns of epigenetic, syngenetic and anti-syngenetic wedges then depend upon ground surface conditions, i.e. whether the ground level remains essentially unchanged or whether there is addition or loss of material.

=== Epigenetic ===
‘Epigenetic’ in geological terms refers to geological features that formed after the formation of the surrounding materials. In relation to ice wedges, this means that epigenetic ice wedges are found to form in preexisting permafrost, and are not formed at the same time as the permafrost meaning they are much younger than the surrounding material. An ice wedge being epigenetic also refers to the fashion in which they grow. These types of ice wedges grow considerably wider over their lifetime, but rarely any deeper or taller. This means that epigenetic ice wedges can grow to at most 3–5 meters in width, but stay roughly the same depth/height as when they had formed. Typically, the sediments on either side of an epigenetic ice wedge, adjacent to the edges of the wedge exhibit upward bending. In an epigenetic ice wedge, the age of the ice on the periphery changes little from top to bottom.

=== Syngenetic ===
Syngenetic ice wedges, like the epigenetic variety, find their roots in the geological term syngenetic, which means forming at the same time as the surrounding material. This is because syngenetic ice wedges grow as the upper permafrost surface rises in response to the addition of material on the ground surface. This allows syngenetic ice wedges to grow very deep, as the surface around them rises with the accumulation of alluvium (in floodplains), peat (in tundra), and gelifluction deposits (at the bottom of a slope), among other materials. Syngenetic ice wedges may only form if the thermal contraction and subsequent ice-veinlet growth can keep pace with the addition of new material. If this is the case, the ice wedge can reach depths of 25 meters, but the average is much less. In a syngenetic ice wedge, the age of the ice on the periphery decreases upwards.

=== Anti-Syngenetic ===
Anti-syngenetic ice wedge were first observed in 1990 during the fieldwork of J. Ross Mackay. Mackay found that anti-syngenetic grew in conditions opposite to those of syngenetic ice wedges in that the anti-syngenetic variety required the removal of material instead of the accumulation and addition of material. Anti-syngenetic ice wedges only form on slopes, where there is a net loss of materials erosion. Similar to syngenetic ice wedges, anti-syngenetic ice wedges can only occur if the rate of thermal contraction cracking and ice-veinlet growth keeps pace with the removal of active material. Anti-syngenetic ice wedges therefore only grow downwards, penetrating deeper into the soil only as the upper layers are removed by mass wasting and erosion. In an anti-syngenetic ice wedge, the age of the ice on the periphery increases upwards.
