= Hydrothermal explosion =

Explosion of superheated ground water converting to steam

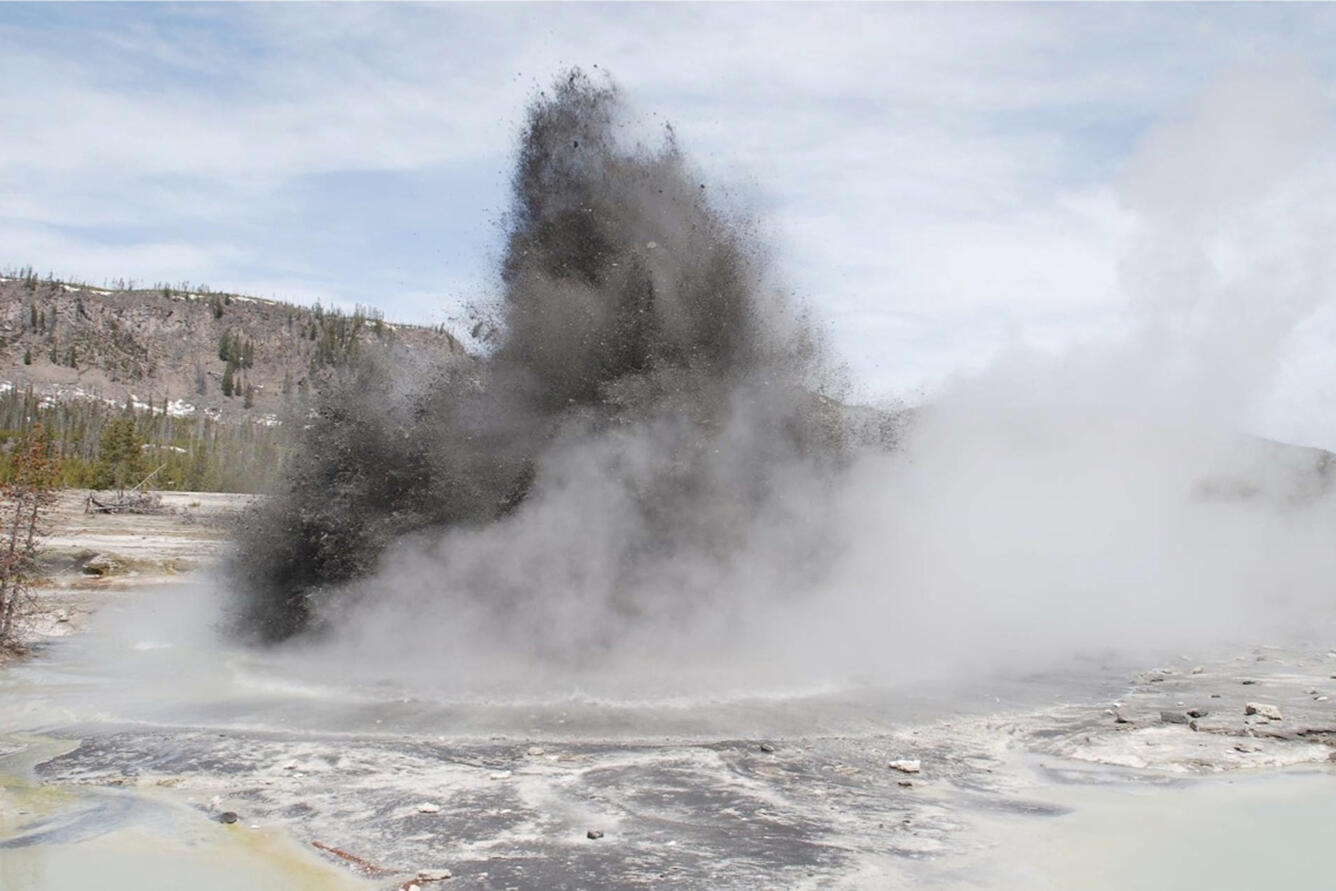
Small 2009 hydrothermal explosion in Biscuit Basin, Yellowstone National Park

Hydrothermal explosions occur when superheated water trapped below the surface of the Earth rapidly converts from liquid to steam, violently disrupting the confining rock. Boiling water, steam, mud, and rock fragments are ejected over an area of a few meters up to several kilometers in diameter. Although the energy originally comes from a deep igneous source, this energy is transferred to the surface by circulating meteoric water or mixtures of meteoric and magmatic water rather than by magma, as occurs in volcanic eruptions. The energy is stored as heat in hot water and rock within a few hundred feet of the surface.

Hydrothermal explosions are caused by the same instability and chain reaction mechanism as geysers but are so violent that rocks and mud are expelled along with water and steam.

== Cause ==
Hydrothermal explosions occur where shallow interconnected reservoirs of water at temperatures as high as 250 °C underlie thermal fields. Water usually boils at 100 °C, but under pressure its boiling point increases, causing the water to become superheated. A sudden reduction in pressure causes a rapid phase transition from liquid to steam, resulting in an explosion of water and rock debris. During the last Ice Age, many hydrothermal explosions were triggered by the release of pressure as glaciers receded. Other causes are seismic activity, erosion, or hydraulic fracturing.

== Yellowstone ==
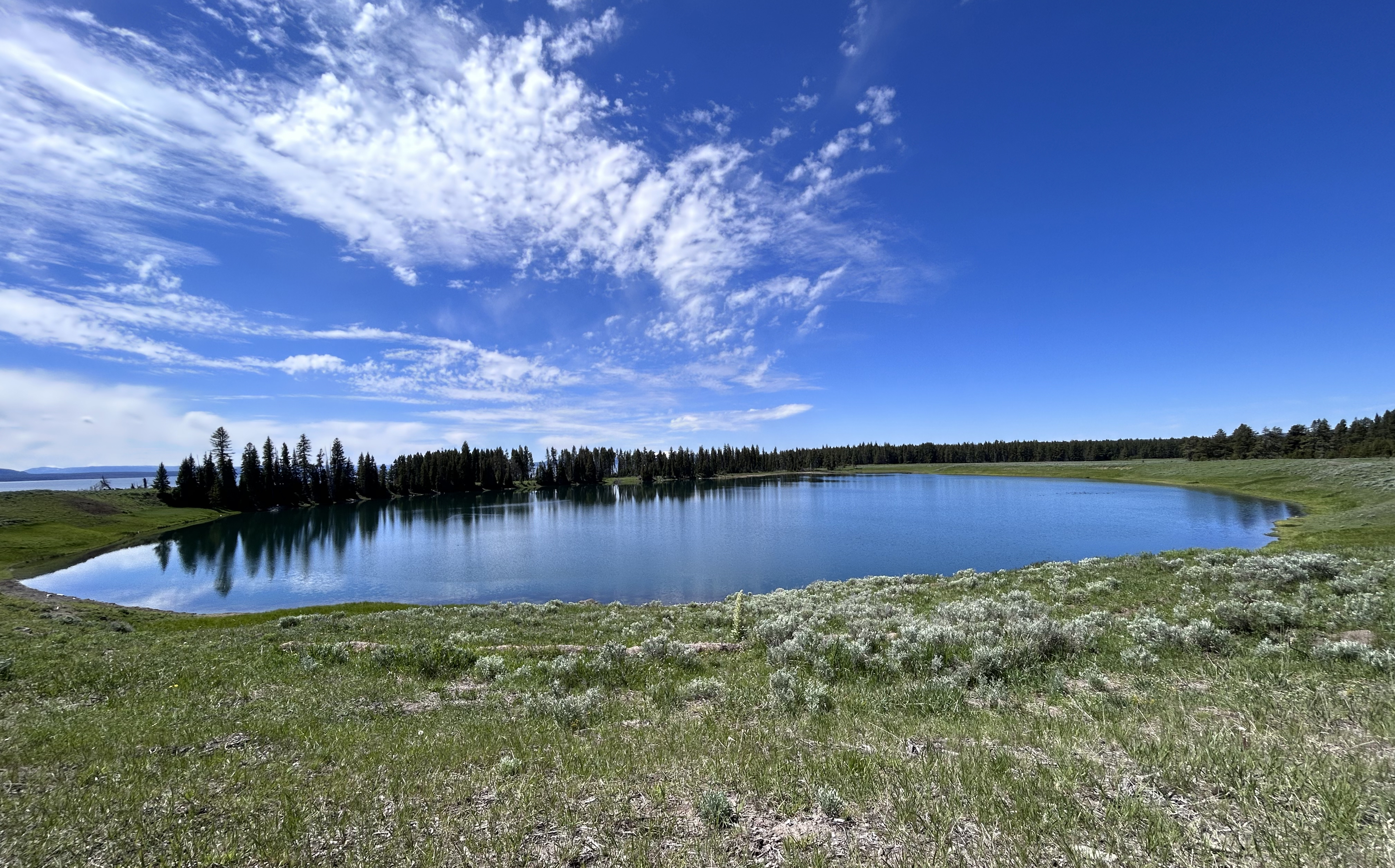
Indian Pond, a 3,000 year old, 350–430 metres (1,150–1,410 ft) diameter hydrothermal explosion crater in Yellowstone National Park

Yellowstone National Park is a thermally active area with an extensive system of hot springs, fumaroles, geysers, and mudpots. There are also several hydrothermal explosion craters, which are not to be confused with calderas, which are collapse features. Eight of these hydrothermal explosion craters are in hydrothermally cemented glacial deposits, and two are in Pleistocene ash-flow tuff. Each is surrounded by a rim composed of debris derived from the crater, 30 to 100 feet (9.1 to 30.5 metres) high.

More than 20 large hydrothermal explosions have occurred at Yellowstone, approximately one every 700 years. The temperature of the magma reservoir below Yellowstone is believed to exceed 800 °C causing the heating of rocks in the region. If so, the average heat flow supplied by convection currents is 30 times greater than anywhere in the Rocky Mountains. Snowmelt and rainfall seep into the ground at a rapid rate and can conduct enough heat to raise the temperature of ground water to almost boiling.

The phenomena of geyser basins are the product of hot ground water rising close to the surface and occasionally bubbling through. Water temperatures of 238 °C at 332 meters have been recorded at Norris Geyser Basin. Pocket Basin was originally an ice-dammed lake over a hydrothermal system. Melting ice during the last glacial period caused the lake to rapidly drain, causing a sudden change in pressure triggering a massive hydrothermal explosion.

=== Geysers ===
A hydrothermal explosion is similar to a geyser's eruption except that it includes surrounding rock and mud and does not occur periodically.

The hydrothermal geyser Old Faithful in Yellowstone National Park throws up plumes of steam and water approximately every hour and a half on average. Typically steam explosions aren't strong enough to majorly displace water and stone, but in Yellowstone's geological history these events have been recorded numerous times and have been found to have created new hills and shaped parts of the landscape.

The largest hydrothermal explosion ever documented was located near the northern edge of Yellowstone Lake, on an embankment commonly known as "Mary Bay". Now consisting of a 1.5 mile crater, it was formed relatively recently, approximately 13,800 years ago. It is believed this crater was formed by a sequence of several hydrothermal explosions in a short time. What triggered this series of events has not yet been clearly established, but volcanologists believe a large earthquake could have played a role by accelerating the melting of nearby glaciers and thus depressurizing the hydrothermal system. Alternatively, rapid changes in the level of Yellowstone Lake may have been responsible.

=== Recent explosions ===
Most of Yellowstone's recent large hydrothermal explosions have been the consequence of sudden changes of pressure deep within the hydrothermal system. Generally, these larger explosions have created craters in a north–south pattern (between Norris and Mammoth Hot Springs). It is estimated that all of the known hydrothermal craters were created between 14,000 and 3,000 years ago. Volcanologists believe no magma has ever broken through the fragile crust of Yellowstone Park or stirred the movement of magma in the reservoir beneath Yellowstone.

Several small hydrothermal explosions have been recorded since the opening of Yellowstone National Park. During the 1880s, Excelsior Geyser in Midway Geyser Basin was known for significant hydrothermal explosions. Other explosions have been linked to seismic events, such as during the 1959 Hebgen Lake earthquake, while others are linked to changes in plumbing below geysers or hot springs, such as the 1989 explosion at Porkchop Geyser in the Norris Geyser Basin. Small hydrothermal eruptions occur nearly yearly, although many occur in Yellowstone's backcountry.

On 23 July 2024, a small hydrothermal explosion was witnessed by several tourists coming from the Black Diamond Pool hot spring in Biscuit Basin. The explosion, probably caused by a change in the plumbing under the hot spring, launched a plume of water and rock fragments 400–600 feet (120–180 m) into the air. Although there were no injuries, the explosion forced the closure of Biscuit Basin for the rest of the 2024 season. As of December 2025, small hydrothermal explosions continue sporadically at the Black Diamond Pool, with Biscuit Basin remaining closed to visitors.

== See also ==
- Boiling liquid expanding vapor explosion
- Gas emission crater
- Phreatic eruption – Volcanic eruption caused by an explosion of steam
