= Kinetic inhibitor =

Substance that inhibits clathrate hydrate formation

Kinetic inhibitors are a new and evolving technology of a class of low-dosage hydrate inhibitors (LDHI) that are polymers and copolymers, or a mix thereof. The most common is polyvinylcaprolactam (PVCap). These inhibitors are primarily used to retard the formation of clathrate hydrates. This problem becomes most prominent in flow lines when hydrocarbons and water flow through a line. The pressure and cold temperatures that could be exposed to the flow lines provides an environment in which clathrate hydrates can form and plug up the flow line. The inhibitors generally slow the formation of the hydrates enough so that the fluid reaches storage without causing blockage.

== Structure ==
There may be variations in the types and structures of the polymers used as inhibitors. However, in general, while the gas hydrate is forming, there is a cavity where the hydrocarbon usually resides. The alkyl group penetrates the cavity, followed by the carbonyl group of the amide group hydrogen-bonding to the surface of the hydrate, thus preventing the formation of hydrates.

== Uses ==
These inhibitors chemically retard the formation of clathrate hydrates. Dosage of such inhibitors in the fluid is usually 0.3% to 0.5% by weight of the fluid, compared to 10% to 50% by weight for thermodynamic inhibitors for prevention of clathrate formation. Due to this and other factors, kinetic inhibitors are more cost-effective than thermodynamic inhibitors. However, if the fluid is in a static environment (i.e. packer fluid), then kinetic inhibitors will have limited effect, as hydrates will still form over sufficient time. At this point the only viable option is thermodynamic inhibitors.
