= Gas hydrate pingo =

Undersea landform

A gas hydrate pingo is a submarine pingo-like dome structure formed by the accumulation of gas hydrates under the seafloor.

== Formation and Location ==
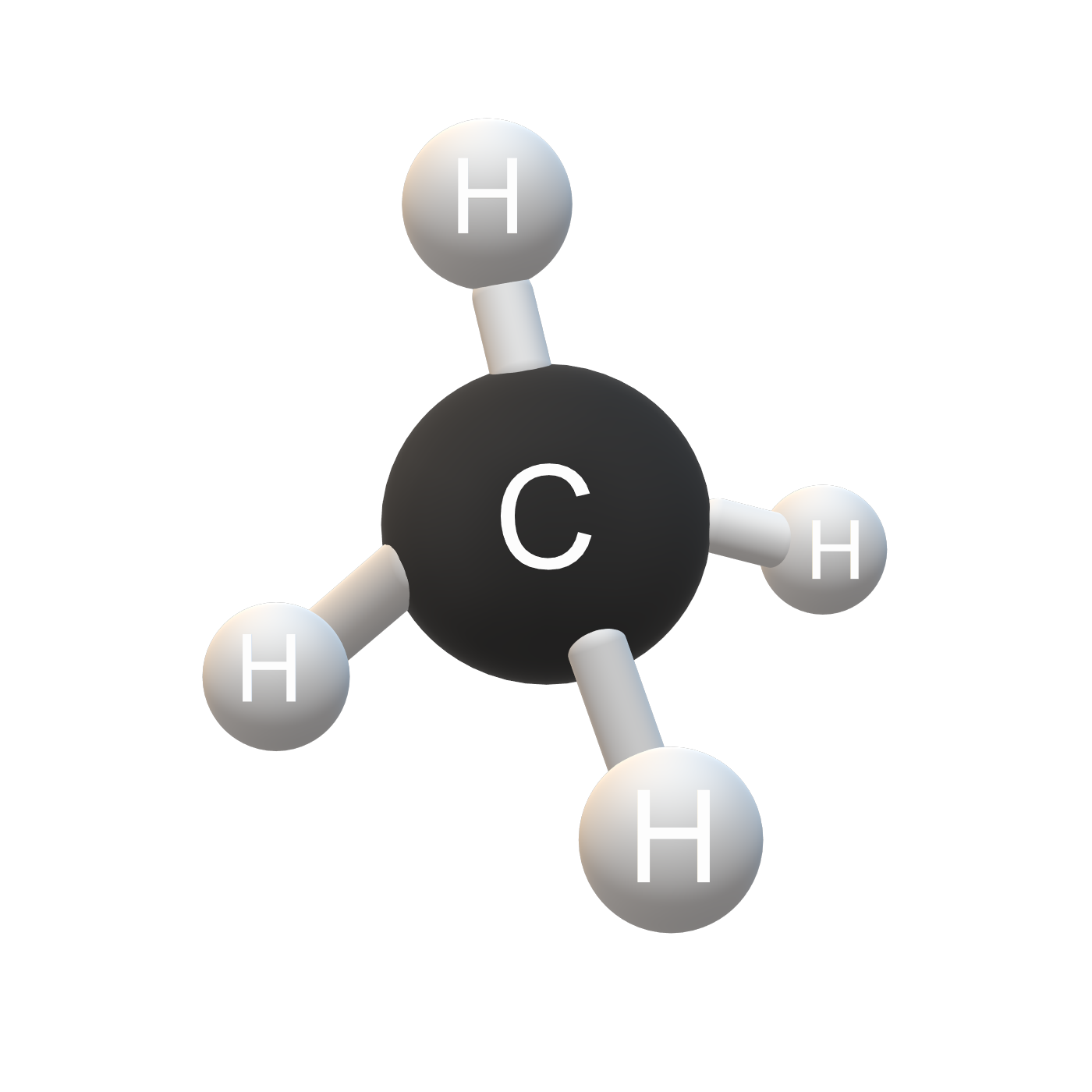
Methane, a common gas found in gas hydrate pingos.

Gas hydrate pingos contain reservoirs of gas hydrates, which are crystallized gas particles. The crystallized gas particles form when a gas particle is surrounded by water molecules. The water molecules create a lattice structure that encages the gas molecule when at low temperatures and high pressures (around 15 megapascals). Most gas hydrates contain methane, while other rare gas hydrates contain hydrogen sulfate or carbon dioxide. These submarine pingos are found along continental margins and in polar regions, especially in locations with methane seeps. These locations often have permafrost that is below sea level, but this permafrost is not required for gas hydrate pingo formation. An example of these different methods of pingo formation can be found on the coast of Angola, which formed from methane seeps, and off the Western Svalbard Margin, which formed from sub-sea permafrost. Other examples of gas hydrate pingos can be found along the Chilean and Brazilian margin.

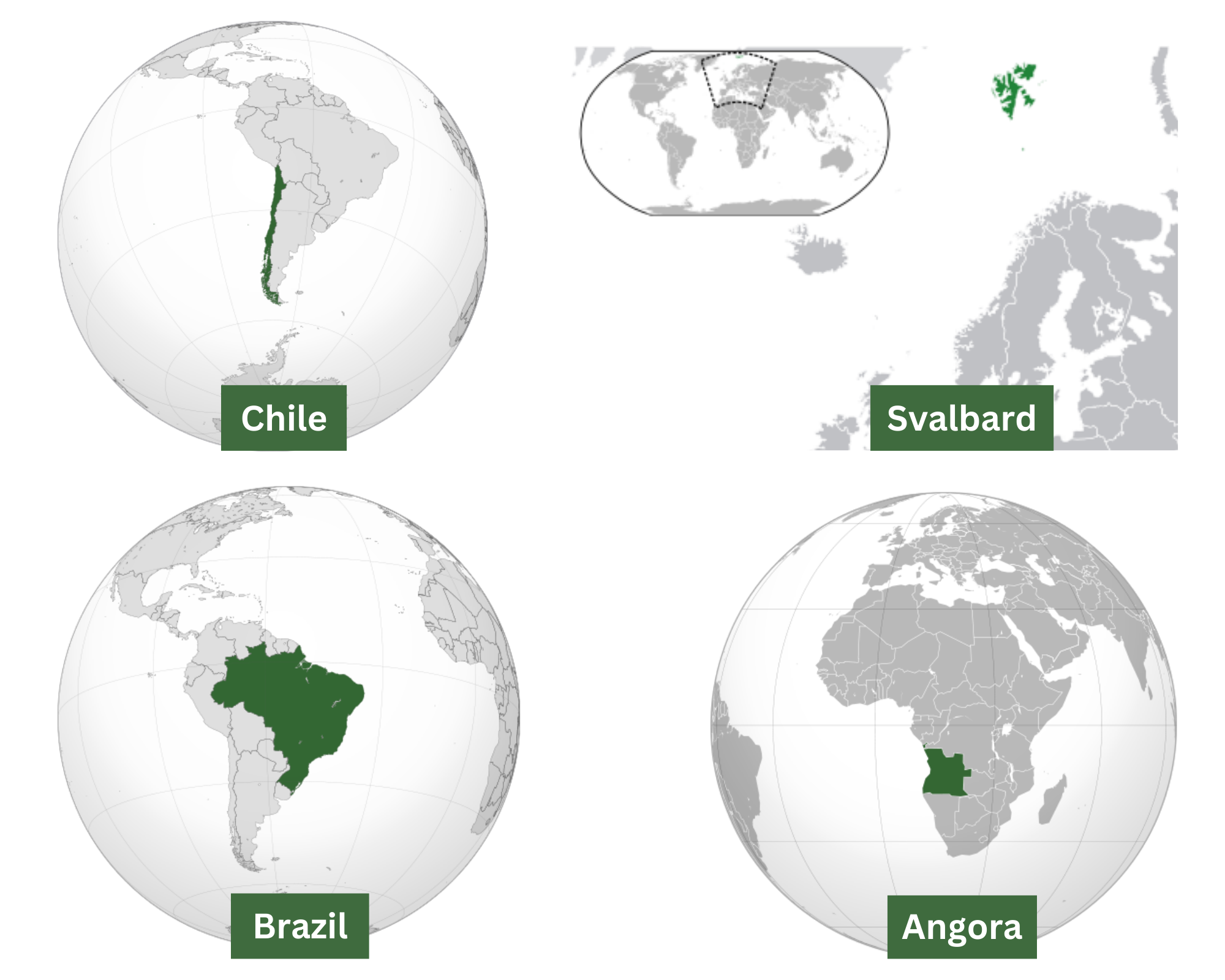
Locations of gas hydrate pingos across the globe

== Effects on Climate and Environment ==
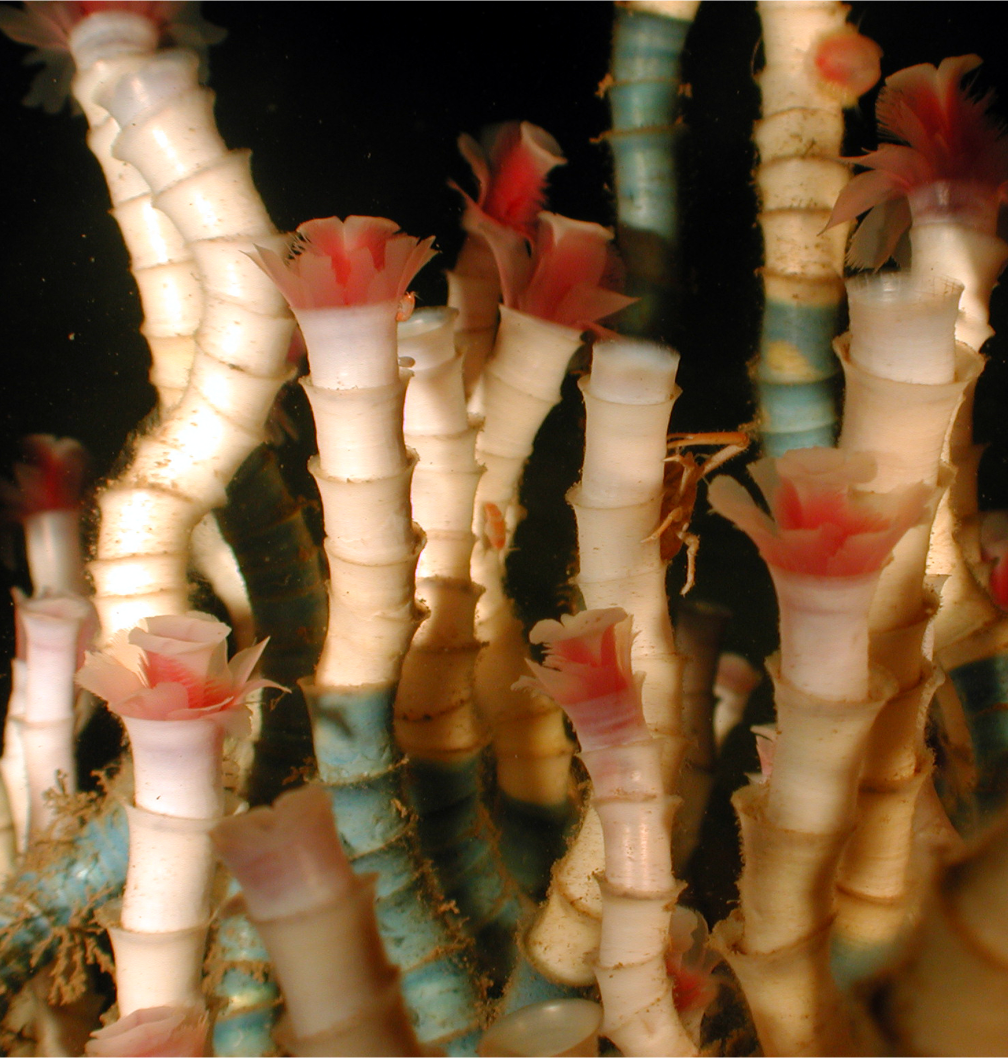
Example of vestimentiferan tube worms found near gas hydrate pingos

Gas hydrates have been studied as a possible form of clean energy, as they could serve as additional natural gas reservoirs. However, as global temperature rises, these gas hydrates become unstable, meaning that they could release greenhouse gases into the atmosphere and contribute to global warming. Gas hydrate pingos can also become unstable due to the high seismic activity in their vicinity, since these formations are often along continental margins and other areas of seismic interest.

Gas hydrate pingos and their surrounding regions are hosts to various organisms, including many types of aquatic worms, mussels, clams, marine snails, shrimp and bacteria. Most of these organisms perform methanogenesis as a form of anaerobic respiration. A study in the Norwegian Sea found that gas hydrate pingos were covered by bacterial mats and Polychaete tubeworms that are associated with methane.
