= Mallik gas hydrate site =

Gas site in Beaufort Sea, Canada

The Mallik gas hydrate site (also known as the Mallik Gas Hydrate Production Research Well or Mallik test well) is located in the Beaufort Sea, Canada.

== Site highlights ==
- First dedicated scientific and technical research site investigating permafrost gas hydrates;
- First location where full-scale thermal and pressure draw down production testing has been completed;
- Site of extensive gas hydrate research and development studies conducted in 1998, 2002 and 2007/2008;
- Quantitative well log determinations and core studies reveal three main intervals of gas hydrates from 890 to 1,160 m, exceeding 110 m in total thickness;
- Gas hydrate occurs within the pore space of medium grained sands with gas hydrate concentrations ranging between 50 and 90%;
- Application of a vertical seismic profile (VSP); used to both study the in-situ gas hydrate reservoir characteristics and the changes induced by production testing;
- The 2002 Research & Development (R&D) program involved 7 participants from 5 countries and focused on fundamental geologic, geophysical and geochemical studies to quantify and characterize in-situ gas hydrate occurrences. In addition, full-scale gas hydrate production by thermal heating was undertaken, achieving only modest gas flows. In the winters of 2007 and 2008, Canada and Japan returned to the site to test the efficiency of producing gas hydrates by drawing down the formation pressure. The program in 2007 installed the well infrastructure and conducted a short production test. The program continued in 2008 with the completion of a six-day production testing program, which succeeded in achieving sustained gas flow to the surface. The R&D program established proof of concept that production from a gas hydrate reservoir can be achieved for conventional oil and gas completion and production methods, modified for the unique properties of gas hydrates.

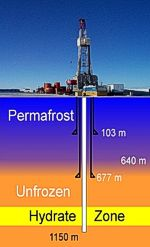
Cross-section of the Mallik drilling site

== Introduction to the area ==
The Mackenzie Delta region on the coast of the Beaufort Sea is not only known for its remarkable Arctic scenery and iconic flora and fauna, but also for its large natural gas and oil deposits. Due to this combination of factors, natural gas occurrences in the Canadian Arctic Ocean region are increasingly the focus of energy resource and climate studies, which aim to develop knowledge of the formation, occurrence, and amount of natural gas hydrates in the area, its impacts on the environment, and what kind of natural and human induced changes may lead to the dissociation of these hydrates. The Delta lies at the mouth of the Mackenzie River where it enters the Beaufort Sea, approximately 2,200 kilometers northwest of Calgary, Alberta. The most important natural gas hydrate research site in the area, the Mallik gas hydrate field, was discovered in 1971 through an exploration well by Imperial Oil Ltd., and is located 50 kilometers north of the Arctic Circle. As natural gas hydrates are assumed to underlie large portions of the world's Arctic continental areas and marine continental shelf and are a tremendous potential future hydrocarbon resource, the Mallik drill site is a location of major interest. Consequently, it has been an area of ongoing scientific and technical research on gas hydrates for more than thirty years.

== General physical and geological description ==
The Department of Natural Resources in Canada identified the Mackenzie Delta region (NRCan) as an important hydrate-bearing region in the Northwest Territories of Canada. NRCan gas hydrate resource estimates from 2005 indicated a hydrate potential between 2.4 × 10^{12} and 87 × 10^{12} m^{3} of natural gas in the Mallik region. A re-evaluation of the Beaufort Sea-Mackenzie Delta basin (see Figure 2) gas-hydrate resource potential in 2010 by the Geological Survey of Canada revealed a potential 8.82 × 10^{12} m^{3} of raw initial natural gas in place (GIP). Nearly all of the natural gas-hydrate accumulations identified in the Mallik area lie beneath a 300 to 700 meter-thick layer of permafrost, at an expected depth of between 890 and 1,100 meters below the surface. The Mallik research drilling site in the Mackenzie Delta basin is located on land and beneath the Beaufort Shelf to about 100 m water depth; the ground-temperature régime in the subsurface is controlled by thick intervals of ice-bonded permafrost.

In the case of permafrost-associated settings in northern Alaska and Canada, gas-hydrate occurrences have been identified in sand-rich units deposited mainly in deltaic environments. Many of the deposits are thought to have formed during the last glacial period when ground temperatures cooled and formerly free-gas reservoirs likely became trapped as hydrates. The geometry, host-reservoir and physical and chemical properties of the modern natural gas-hydrate occurrences point to a conversion of conventional free-gas accumulations when they were cooled down to a point that was well within the hydrate stability conditions, allowing hydrates to form.

== Mallik Gas Hydrate Production Research Well, Canada ==
The Mallik Gas Hydrate Production Research Well, part of the "Methane Hydrate Research and Development (R&D) Program", is located on the northwest side of Richards Islands and is a part of the Mackenzie Delta, entering the Beaufort Sea. The production research well project was developed in the Mallik region after methane hydrate was recovered there by a research project in 1998, led by the Geological Survey of Canada and the former Japan Oil, Gas and Metals National Corporation (JNOC), with participation by the United States Geological Survey (USGS), the United States Department of Energy (DOE) as well as other industry partners. The project included working efforts of more than 200 scientists and engineers worldwide. Up to today numerous papers have been published to document the results and additional datasets, and provide information on in-situ physical and geophysical properties of gas hydrates, gas hydrate production testing, and the relevance of gas hydrates to energy, climate and geohazard research. Its main outcome was the characterization of gas hydrates found in the Northwest Territories and planning of additional field and laboratory studies. The aim was to determine the future potential for methane as an important factor of the future world energy consumption, additional energy policy and to assess the production and properties of the gas hydrate and its stability. The program was further developed to find out if the increased use of burning methane could contribute to reductions in greenhouse gas emissions on a global scale, impacting future climate change if released into the environment. Furthermore, the scientific study aimed to develop new safety techniques guarding against any hazardous conditions created by gas hydrate drilling and pipeline construction and give insights into drilling and production technology with regard to a new industrial development.

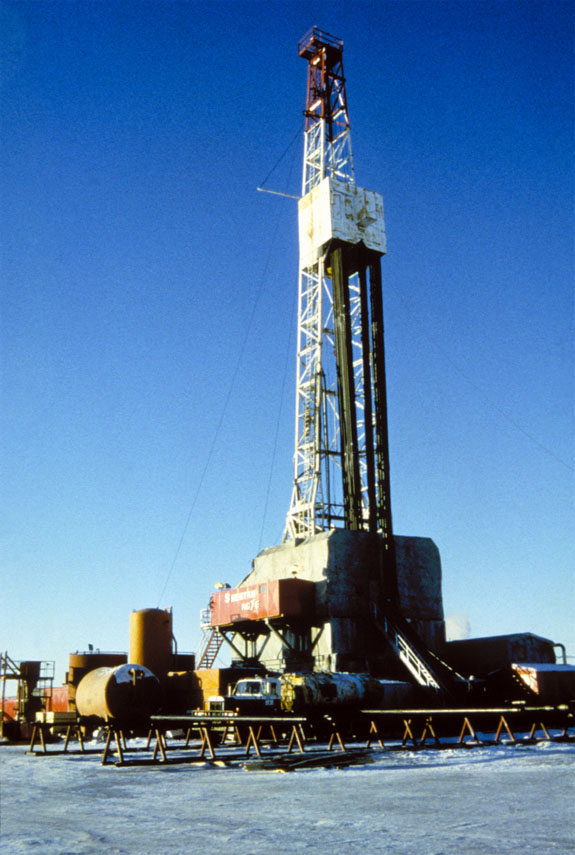
Image of the Mallik drilling site in Canada

Over a timeline of six years – drilling began in December 2001 – three different wells (two observation wells: Mallik 3L-38 and 4L-38, one production test well: Mallik 5L-38) were successfully drilled at the Mallik research site. Field operations included the acquisition of a full suite of open-hole logs, permafrost- and hydrate-bearing continuous core, and cross-hole tomography experiments before, during and after production testing. The wells were drilled vertically to a depth of 1,160 meters below land surface. Subsequent analysis of the logging data confirmed the existence of a total of approximately 110 meters (360 feet) of combined 50–90% saturated gas hydrate-bearing unconsolidated medium-grained sand reservoir intervals within interbedded sand, sandstone, silt, and siltstone of the Oligocene Kugmallit Sequence. The natural gas hydrates in these sand-rich intervals in the Mackenzie Delta region mainly occur as pore-filling material in the sand reservoirs and can also infrequently be observed as coatings around individual sand grains. The gas trapped inside the clathrates is predominantly thermogenic methane that generated due to a thermal alteration of organic material. Given the chemical and carbon-isotope compositions of the organic matter, the organic material is predominantly composed of a variety of higher land plants with a terrestrial origin.

In the winters of 2007 and 2008, a smaller participant group, including JNOC and the Geological Survey of Canada, conducted a new Mallik program with the primary objective to install physical installations for production testing and re-injection of produced water, to deploy and evaluate new monitoring systems, and to undertake a short-term pressure drawdown test to gain new and groundbreaking insights prior to undertaking long-term production tests in 2008. Ongoing analysis of the data collected throughout the program will lead to a greater and better understanding of gas hydrate properties and its formation, production response, and the effectiveness of conventional production technologies. Scientific and engineering results were made publicly available to scientists, stakeholders and engineers through the Bulletin of the Geological Survey of Canada (Bulletin 544 and 585).

== Importance as an active study site ==
Mallik, as an ongoing gas hydrate research site, is the first fully integrated field study and modern production test well of natural gas hydrates in Canada. The wells were drilled to test a major natural gas hydrate accumulation in the Mackenzie Delta of the northwestern Canadian Arctic. It gave scientists the opportunity to monitor the physical response of gas hydrate deposits and investigate permafrost gas hydrates in one of its most prominent occurrences. From a technical perspective, the results from the scientific R&D Program in the Mackenzie Delta basin confirmed pre-drill predictions that gas hydrates were present in high-saturation, sand-rich reservoirs. Scientists were able to successfully recover wireline cores through the different gas hydrate intervals. Also, experts could carry out cross-hole tomography experiments not only before, but also during and after the actual production tests. During the project, a suite of several different open-hole logs could be obtained by using advanced and new gas hydrate logging tools, giving first insights into the reservoir thickness and general natural gas hydrate saturations. Due to a lack of pipeline or gathering system, there is currently only one field in the Mackenzie Delta – providing natural gas to the town of Inuvik – and no commercial oil or gas production.

Furthermore, the thermal-simulation tests conducted at research well Mallik 5L-38 were not only carried out to evaluate a potential production method or to prove the commercial viability of gas hydrates in Canada but also to observe the dissociation of a gas hydrate interval at temperatures above the gas hydrate stability point, while maintaining constant pressure. The results of the thermal simulation were then used to calibrate numerical simulation models that give new insights into the kinetic and thermodynamic properties of gas hydrates.
