= Hexadecahedron =

Polyhedron with 16 faces

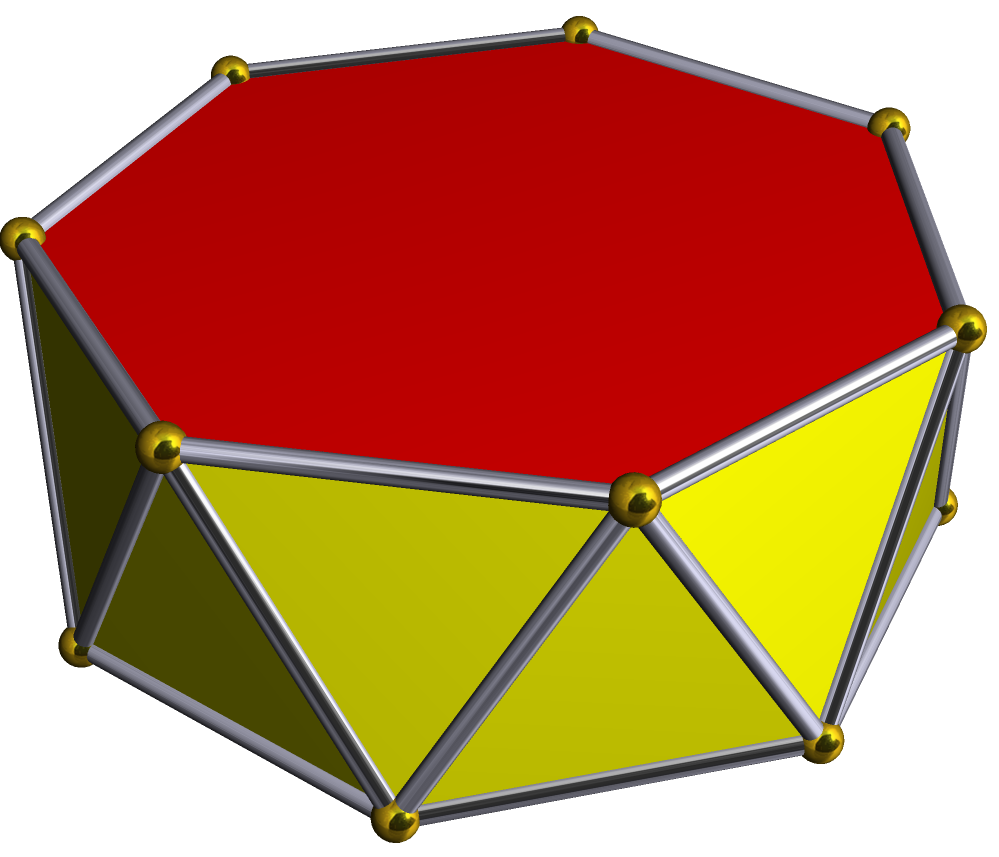
An example of an Hexadecahedron

A hexadecahedron (or hexakaidecahedron) is a polyhedron with 16 faces. No hexadecahedron is regular; hence, the name is ambiguous. There are numerous topologically distinct forms of a hexadecahedron, for example the pentadecagonal pyramid, tetradecagonal prism and heptagonal antiprism.

== Convex hexadecahedra ==
There are 387,591,510,244 topologically distinct convex hexadecahedra, excluding mirror images, having at least 10 vertices. (Two polyhedra are "topologically distinct" if they have intrinsically different arrangements of faces and vertices, such that it is impossible to distort one into the other simply by changing the lengths of edges or the angles between edges or faces.)

== Self-dual hexadecahedra ==
There are 302,404 self-dual hexadecahedron, 1476 with at least order 2 symmetry. The high symmetry self-dual has chiral tetrahedral symmetry, and can be seen topologically by removing 4 of 20 vertices of a regular dodecahedron and is called a tetrahedrally diminished dodecahedron.

== Examples ==
The following list gives examples of hexadecahedra.

- Heptagonal antiprism
- Gyroelongated pentagonal pyramid
- Gyroelongated square bipyramid
- Augmented dodecahedron
- Truncated triakis tetrahedron
