= Pingo =

Mound of earth-covered ice

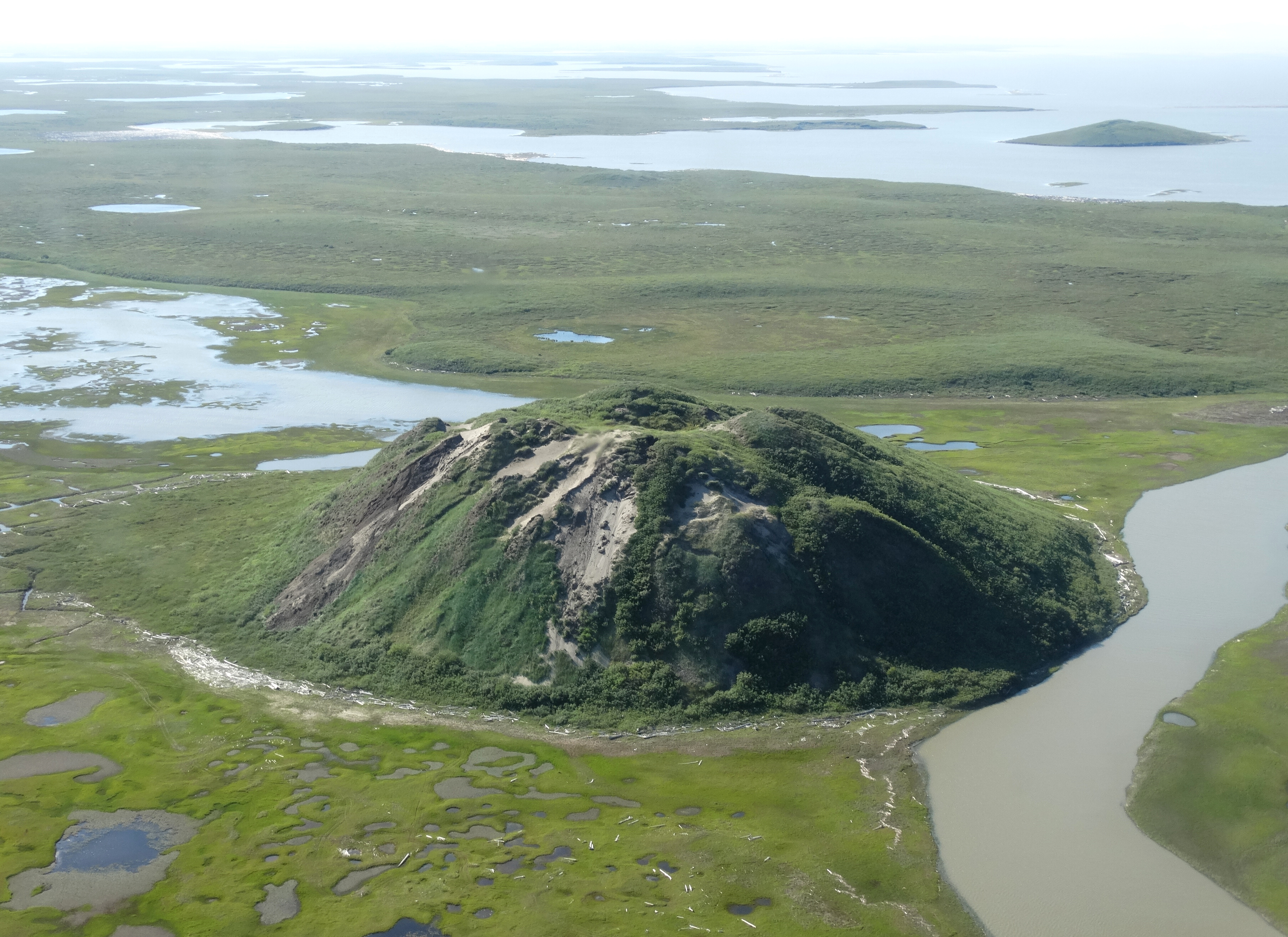
Ibyuk pingo near Tuktoyaktuk, northern Canada

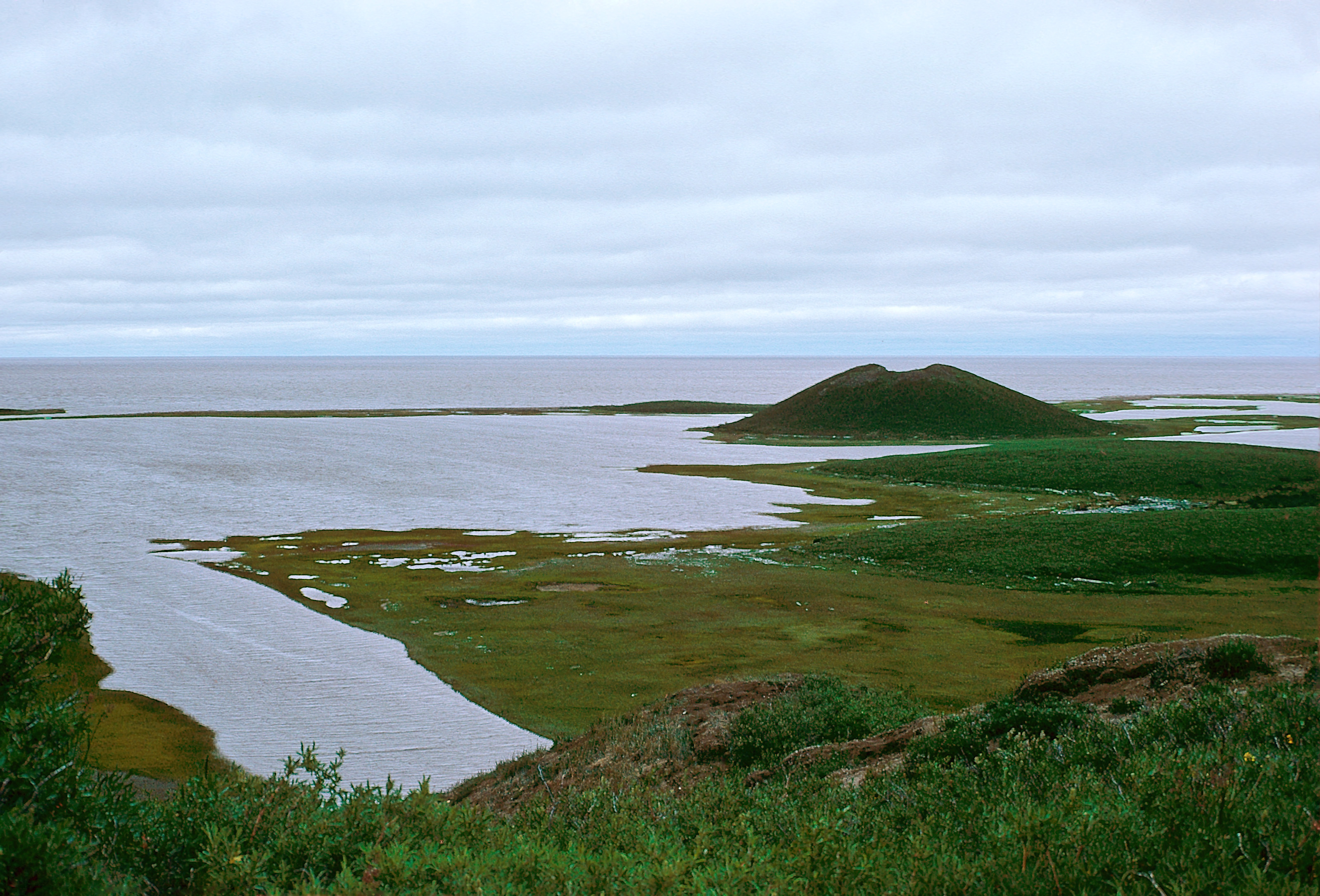
View from top of a pingo towards another, within a partly drained lake, the Arctic Ocean in the background (near Tuktoyaktuk). July 20, 1975.

Pingos are intrapermafrost ice-cored hills, 3–70 m (10–230 ft) high and 30–1,000 m (98–3,281 ft) in diameter. They are typically conical in shape and grow and persist only in permafrost environments, such as the Arctic and subarctic. A pingo is a periglacial landform, which is defined as a non-glacial landform or process linked to colder climates. It is estimated that there are more than 11,000 pingos on Earth, with the Tuktoyaktuk peninsula area having the greatest concentration at a total of 1,350.

== History ==
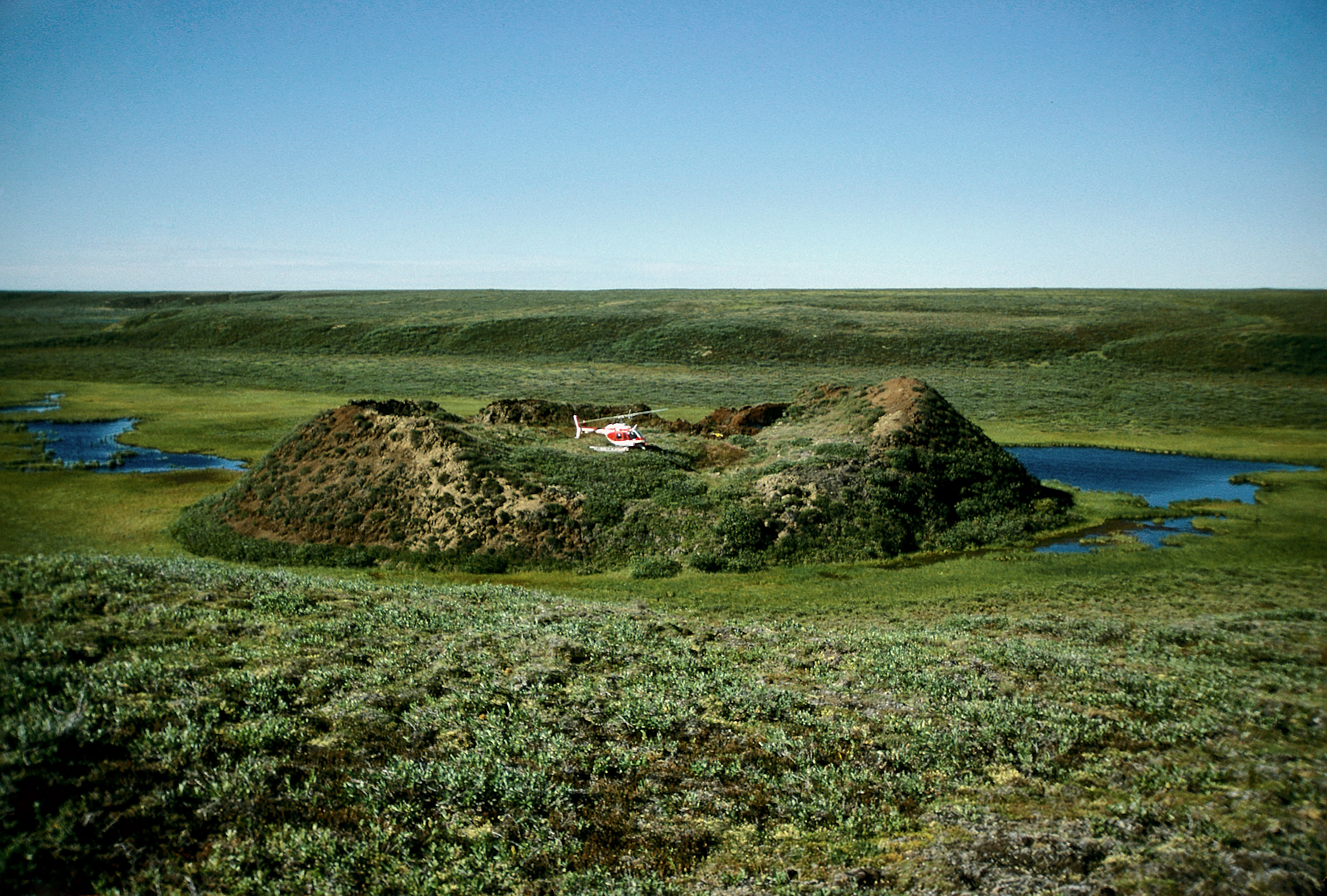
Collapsed pingo in the Mackenzie Delta. The outline of the previously drained lake can be seen. August 8, 1987.

In 1825, John Franklin made the earliest description of a pingo when he climbed a small pingo on Ellice Island in the Mackenzie Delta. However, it was in 1938 that the term pingo was first borrowed from the Inuvialuit by the Arctic botanist Alf Erling Porsild in his paper on Earth mounds of the western Arctic coast of Canada and Alaska. Porsild Pingo in Tuktoyaktuk is named in his honour. The term pingo, which in Inuvialuktun means conical hill, has now been accepted as a scientific term in English-language literature.

== Formation ==
Pingos can only form in a permafrost environment. Evidence of collapsed pingos in an area suggests that there was once permafrost. Pingos can collapse due to the melting of the supporting ice and give rise to a depression in the landscape showing an inverse shape (horizontal mirror).

=== Hydrostatic pingos ===
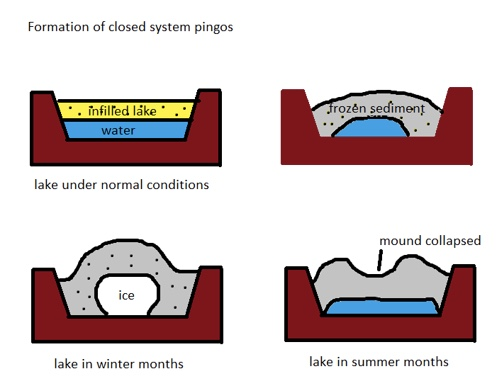
Diagram showing how closed system (hydrostatic) pingos are formed

Closed systems, also known as hydrostatic pingos, are formed as a result of hydrostatic pressure that has built up within the core of pingos due to water. They occur in regions of continuous permafrost where there is an impermeable ground layer. These pingos are found in flat, poorly drained areas with limited groundwater available such as shallow lakes and river deltas. The formation of these landforms occurs when layers of permafrost generate an upwards movement or pressure, resulting in masses of confined soil freezing, which pushes material upwards due to expansion.

The figure illustrates this process and the changes that occur throughout the year. This type of closed system pingos is formed in an area where a lake has been infilled with sediment. This indicates that the ground is insulated, allowing liquid water to collect underneath the sediment. In winter months this sediment begins to freeze which leads to expansion of sediment, confining the water and increasing the pressure. This results in the formation of a mound due to the upwards pressure. However, during summer months the ice core of the pingo begins to melt which causes the mound to cave in.

=== Hydraulic pingos ===
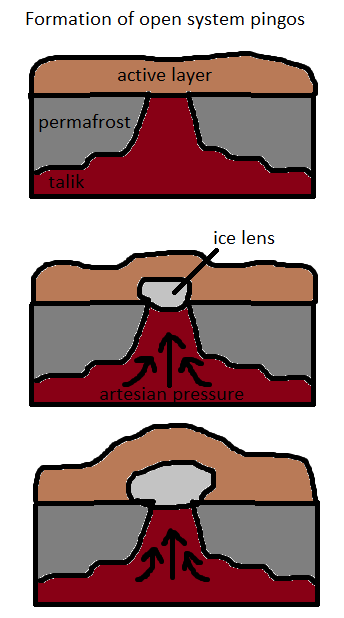
Diagram showing how open system (hydraulic) pingos are formed

Hydraulic (open-system) pingos result from groundwater flowing from an outside source, i.e. sub-permafrost or intra-permafrost aquifers. Hydrostatic pressure initializes the formation of the ice core as water is pushed up and subsequently freezes. Open-system pingos have no limitations to the amount of water available unless the aquifers freeze. They often occur at the base of slopes and are commonly known as Greenland type. The groundwater is put under artesian pressure and forces the ground up as it makes an expanding ice core. It is not the artesian pressure itself that forces the ground up, but rather the ice core that is being fed the water from the aquifer. These are often formed in a thin, discontinuous permafrost. These conditions allow an ice core to form, but also provide it with a supply of artesian ground water. If water pressure entering an artesian pingo is strong enough, it can lift the pingo up allowing a sub-pingo water lens to form underneath. However, if the water lens starts to leak water it can cause subsidence which can compromise the structure. These pingos are often oval or oblong shaped. It is still not entirely understood why open system or hydraulic pingos normally occur in unglaciated terrain.

Pingos usually grow only a couple of centimetres per year, with Ibyuk Pingo growing at a rate of 2 cm (0.79 in) a year, and the largest take decades or even centuries to form. The process that creates pingos is believed to be closely related to frost heaving. The base of the pingo tends to reach its maximum diameter in its early youth. This means pingos tend to grow higher rather than growing in diameter and height at the same time. The height of pingos can range anywhere from 3 to 70 m (9.8 to 229.7 ft) and their diameters range from 30 to 1,000 m (98 to 3,281 ft). The shape of pingos is usually circular. Smaller pingos tend to have curved tops whereas larger pingos usually have collapsed mounds or craters due to the melting of exposed ice.

== Locations ==
=== Greenland ===
The landscape of Greenland contains many pingos and other glacial landforms. In western Greenland it is estimated that there are 29 pingos, whilst in eastern Greenland it is estimated there are 71 pingos. The majority of pingos in Greenland are located within Disko Bay and Nuussuaq Peninsula within western Greenland as well as some in eastern Greenland in Mesters Vig. The permafrost at Disko Bay is around 150 m (490 ft) deep, providing for ideal conditions for the development of closed system pingos. There are 20 pingos located on Disko Island, with the largest located on Kuganguaq alluvial plain at 100 m (330 ft) wide and 15 m (49 ft) high.

In eastern Greenland, pingos are found in Nioghalvfjerdsfjorden. They are well known because they are the northernmost pingos of eastern Greenland. The largest of these pingos is 100 m (330 ft) wide and 8 m (26 ft) high, taking the shape of a semicircle. This pingo is still active, meaning it is increasing in elevation over time.

=== Canada ===
==== Tuktoyaktuk Peninsula pingos ====
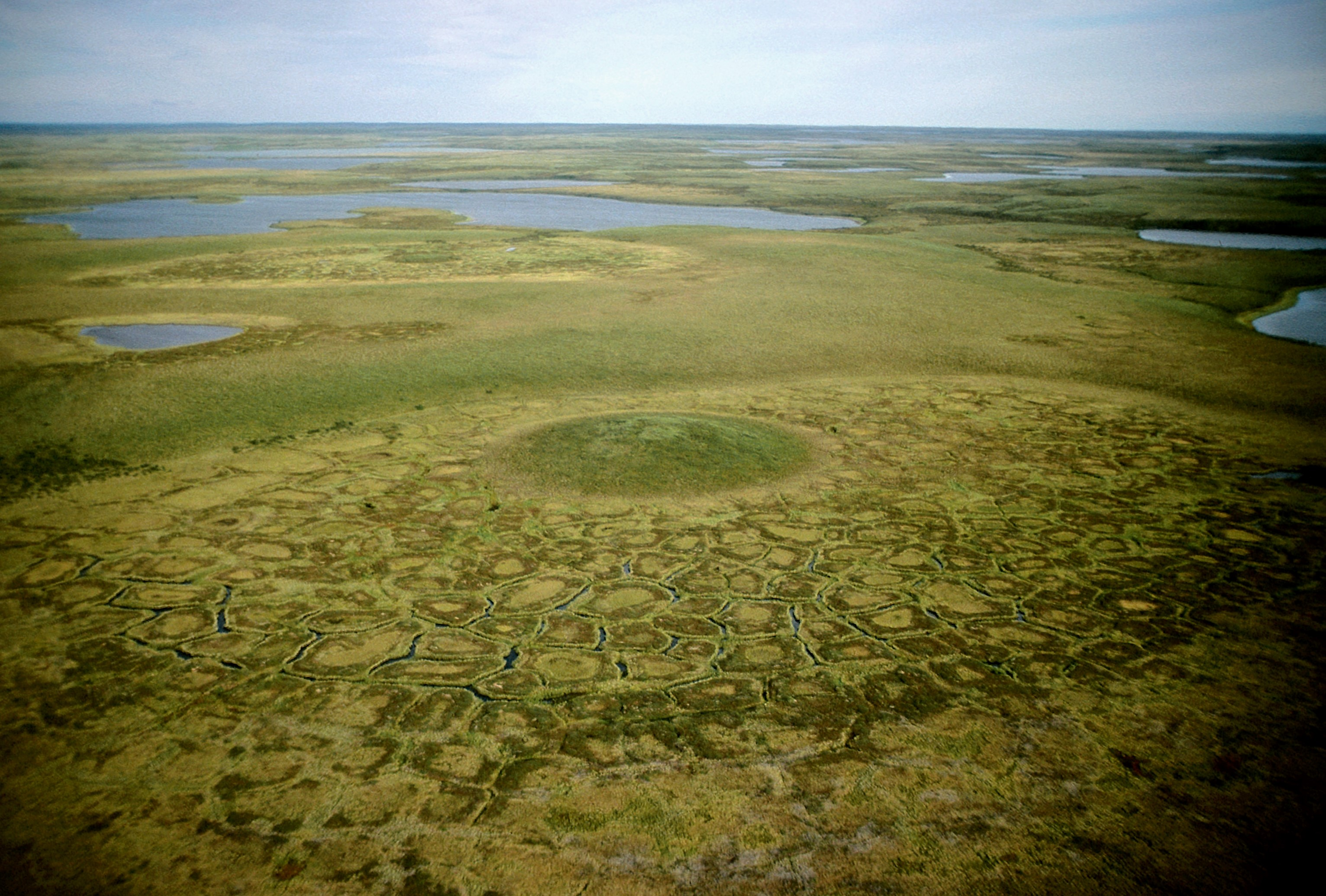
Mackenzie delta with drained lake (foreground), ice-wedge polygons and a growing pingo, August 1987

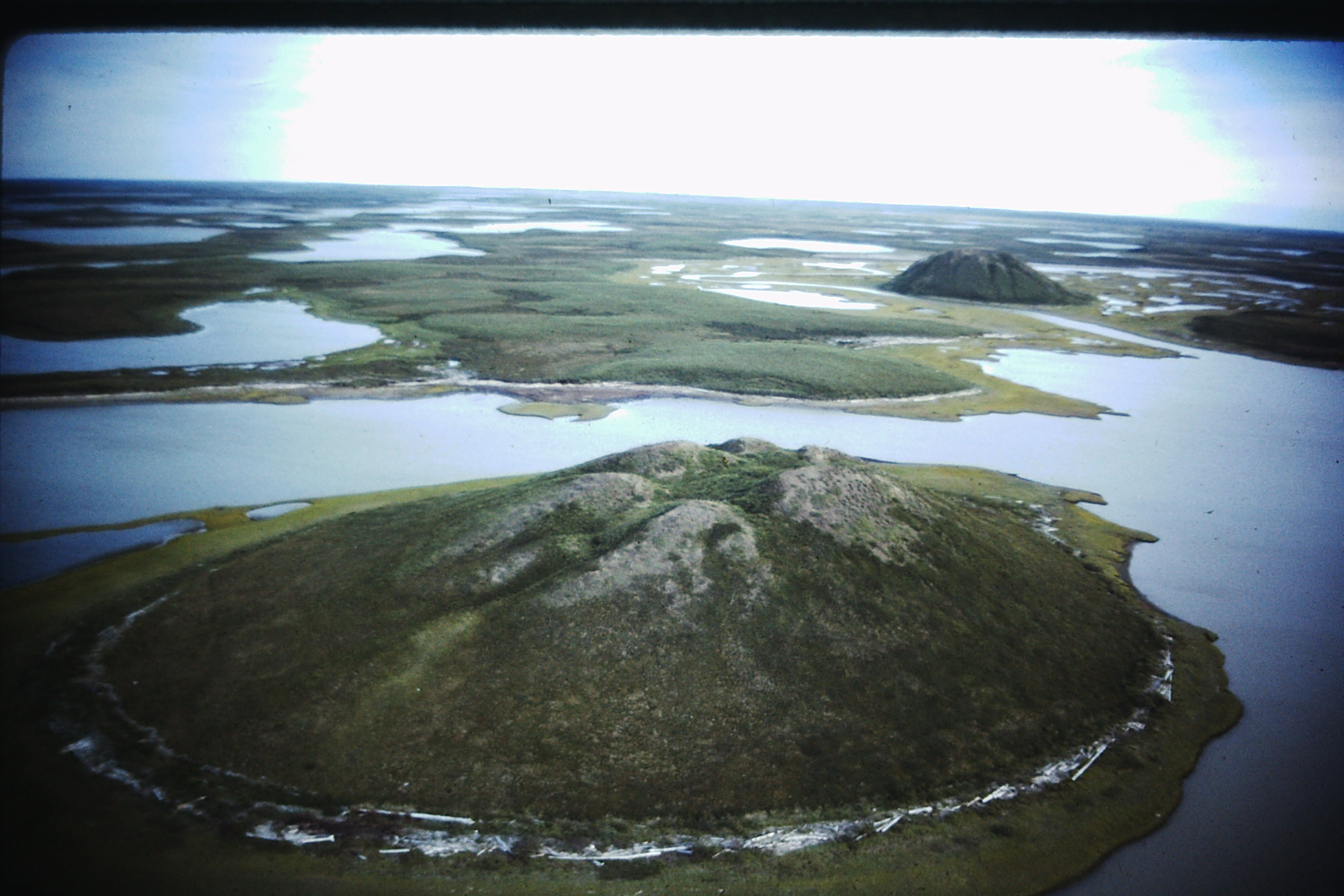
Pingo in the Mackenzie delta area

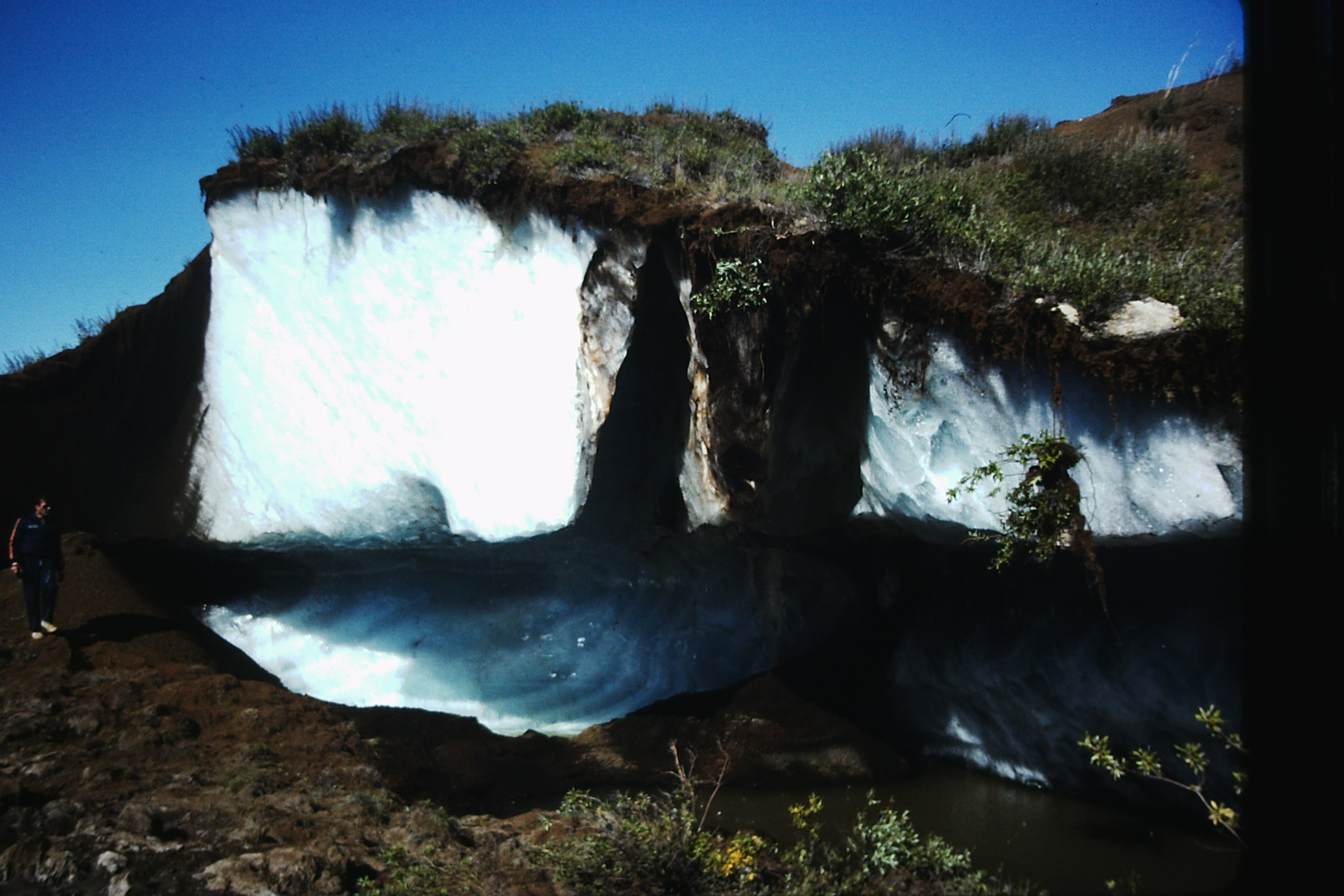
Injection ice in a pingo, Mackenzie delta area

The Tuktoyaktuk Peninsula is an area with a marine tundra environment on the shores of the Arctic Ocean in the Northwest Territories, Canada. This peninsula is covered in thick permafrost, which is known to be more than 50,000 years old. There are many pingos within the Pingo Canadian Landmark area, all ranging in size and diameter. The most well known pingo in this area is Ibyuk Pingo, which is the tallest pingo in Canada. The height of this pingo is 50 m (160 ft) above sea level, but the pingo is still increasing in height by a few centimetres every year. This pingo is one of the younger pingos in the area, estimated at around 1,000 years old. Since about 1990, several larger pingos have started to melt out as the injection ice of the core is exposed.

=== Alaska ===
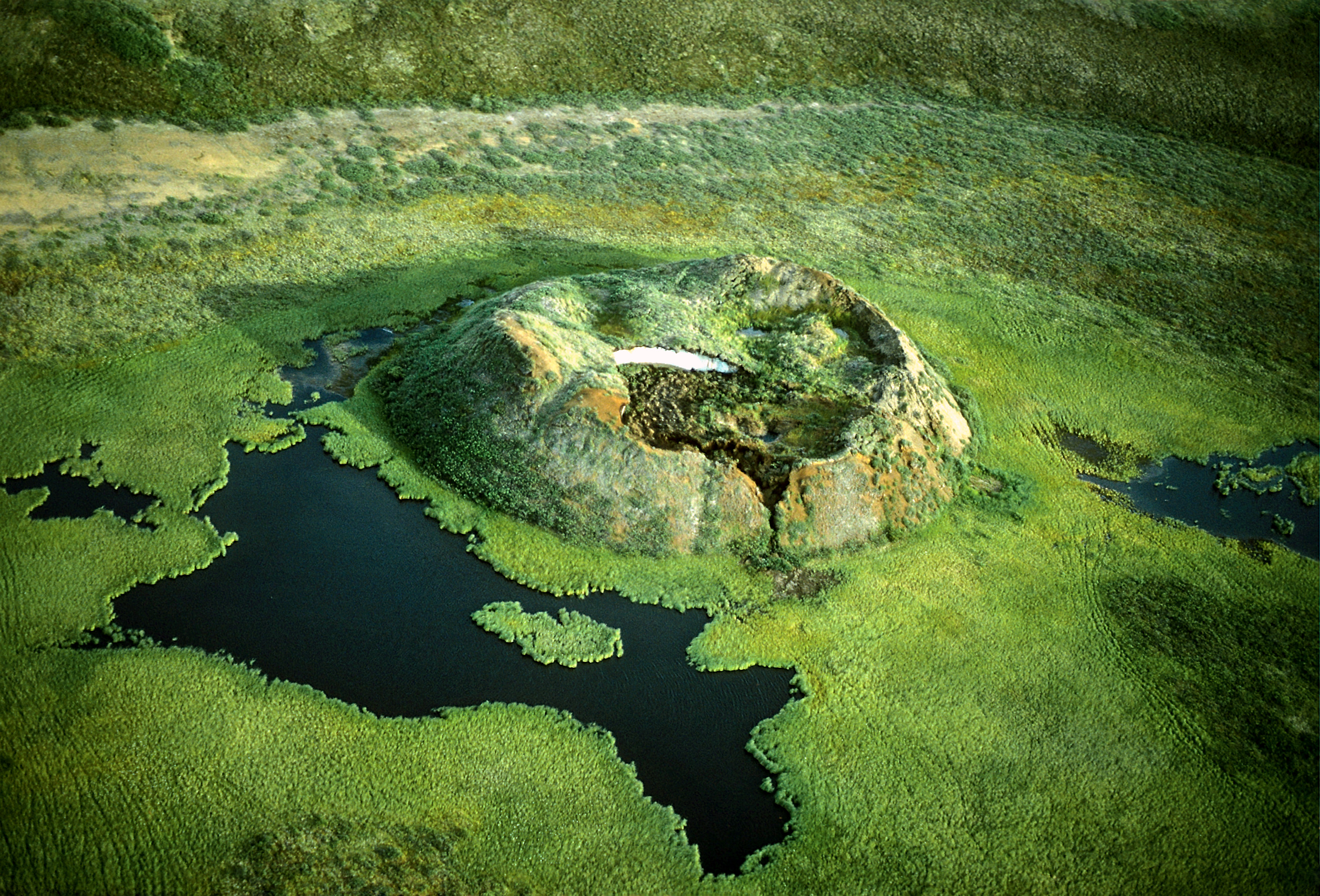
Collapsed pingo in the Mackenzie Delta with thick injection ice. The outline of the previously drained lake can be seen. August 8, 1987.

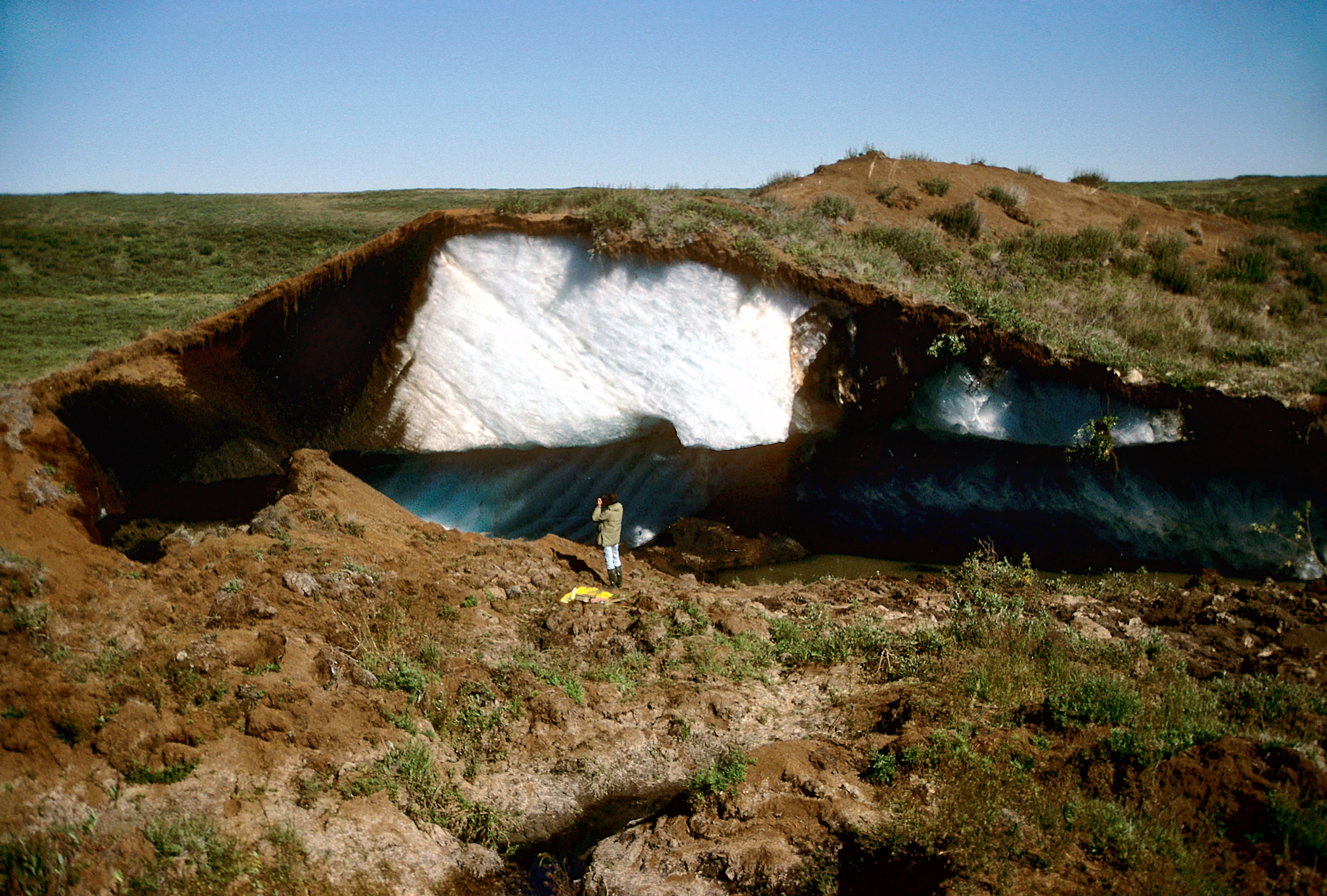
Detail of pingo in the Mackenzie Delta with massive injection ice. August 8, 1987.

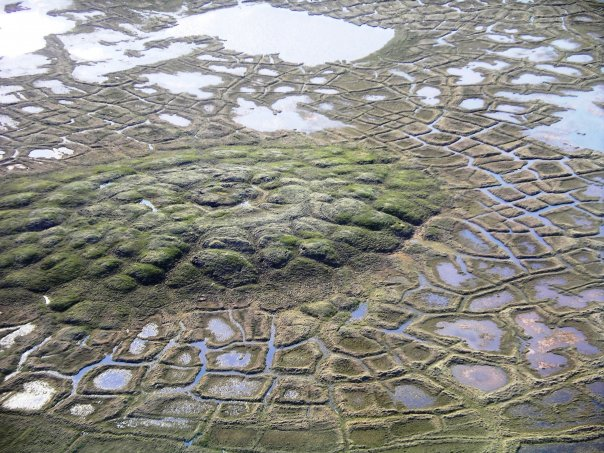
Melting pingos near Tuktoyaktuk, Northwest Territories, Canada

Approximately 80% of Alaska is covered in permafrost, with 29% of this continuous permafrost, 35% discontinuous permafrost and the rest sporadic or isolated permafrost. Throughout Alaska, there are more than 1,500 known pingos with the majority being open system pingos. The height of pingos in Alaska ranges from 3 to 54 m (9.8 to 177.2 ft) in height and 15 to 450 m (49 to 1,476 ft) in width. The world's tallest pingo is located in Alaska, known as the Kadleroshilik Pingo. The Kadleroshilik Pingo is 54 m (177 ft) in height, but is continuing to rise in elevation by a few centimeters a year.

=== Siberia ===
In Siberia, an area containing a high density of close system pingos can be found near Yakutsk located on the Lena River. In this area there are more than 500 pingos next to the Lena River. The area consists of alluvial plains areas of thick permafrost, allowing pingos to form and develop. Locals refer to a particular type of pingo as “trembling tundra” because they jiggle, some of which explode due to methane build-up.

=== Central Asia ===
Areas of Central Asia are known to have pingos at the highest elevations in the world. For example, the Tibetan Plateau has pingos at above 4,000 m (13,000 ft) in elevation due to its permanently frozen terrain. This environment is perfect for pingo production, and the cold, dry permafrost along with cold temperatures deters pingo collapse.

=== Scandinavia ===
Despite its high latitude and the occurrence of permafrost, no modern pingos are known from Scandinavia. Palsa mounds in Scandinavia have been mistaken for pingos. Some depressions found in Jutland, and some circular lakes in the Finnmarksvidda plateau may be remnants of collapsed pingos. The possible Jutland pingos could have developed during the Weichselian glaciation and the possible Finnmarkvidda pingos during cold periods of the last deglaciation.

=== United Kingdom ===
Evidence of collapsed pingos formed in the last ice age are to be found in a number of locations in the United Kingdom, notably Thompson Common near Thetford managed by the Norfolk Wildlife Trust and designated as a Site of Special Scientific Interest for its collection of approximately 400 pingo ponds. The Rockingham Anomaly in Elephant and Castle, London, with its well-preserved peat, has also been interpreted as a relict pingo.

=== Mars ===
Although no pingos have been confirmed to be located on Mars, there are signs of pingo-like features (PLFs). PLFs are periglacial features that are not classed as pingos. This is usually because they are not large enough or there is not enough evidence to class them as pingos.

== Effects of climate change ==
Global warming is causing Arctic temperatures to rapidly rise, causing permafrost to thaw. For this reason, permafrost environments are extremely vulnerable to climate change in the Arctic. Permafrost degradation caused by climate warming is indicated by increased mean annual ground temperature, increased active layer thickness, talik and thermokarst development and disappearance of permafrost islands. The interchange between permafrost degradation and aggradation shapes sub-Arctic and Arctic lowland landscapes, and therefore contain records of past climate and landscape development.

Pingos are vulnerable to surface disturbance given the considerable amount of ground ice stored within them. Abrupt permafrost thaw processes can cause ice wedges within pingos to melt, which can result in increased pingo collapse and the formation of remnant lakes. However, there are currently few studies investigating how climate change could affect formation and growth of pingos.

== See also ==
- Gas hydrate pingo – Submarine dome structure formed by the accumulation of gas hydrates under the seafloor that resembles a pingo
- Mima mounds – small natural geological rises of varying causes
- Cryovolcano – Volcano that erupts gases and volatile material
- Frost heaving – Upwards swelling of soil during freezing
- Kettle (landform) – Depression formed by glaciers or floodwaters. Some are known as pingo ponds especially in Norfolk, England.
- Laccolith – Mass of igneous rock formed from magma
- Palsa – Low frost heave in polar and subpolar climates
- Periglacial lake – Lake bordering a glacier or ice sheet

== Bibliography ==
- Easterbrook, Don J. (1999) Surface Processes and Landforms Second Edition, Prentice-Hall, Inc., pp. 412–416, ISBN 0-13-860958-6.
- Burr, Devon M.; Tanaka, Kenneth L.; Yoshikawa, Kenji (2009). "Pingos on Earth and Mars". Planetary and Space Science. 57 (5–6): 541–555. Bibcode:2009P&SS...57..541B. doi:10.1016/j.pss.2008.11.003. ISSN 0032-0633.
