= Flow assurance =

Ensuring successful, economical hydrocarbon-stream flow

In the oil and gas industry, flow assurance refers to ensuring successful and economical flow of a hydrocarbon stream from reservoir to the point of sale. The term was coined by Petrobras in the early 1990s ahead of a DeepStar Program meeting, in Portuguese as Garantia do Escoamento (pt:Garantia do Escoamento), meaning literally "guarantee of flow", or flow assurance.

Flow assurance is extremely diverse, encompassing many discrete and specialized subjects and bridging across the full gamut of engineering disciplines. Besides network modeling and transient multiphase simulation, flow assurance involves effectively handling many solid deposits, such as, gas hydrates, asphaltene, wax, scale, and naphthenates. Flow assurance is the most critical task during deep water energy production because of the high pressures and low temperature (~4 degree Celsius) involved. The financial loss from production interruption or asset damage due to flow assurance mishap can be astronomical. What compounds the flow assurance task even further is that these solid deposits can interact with each other, and can cause catastrophic blockage formation in pipelines and result in flow assurance failure.

Flow assurance includes thermal investigation of pipelines, making sure the temperature is above the hydrate's formation temperature. Other important aspects of flow assurance are the estimation of stable production limits, and evaluation of erosion due to sand and corrosion in pipelines and equipment.
