= Talik =

Permanently-thawed zone amid a permafrost area

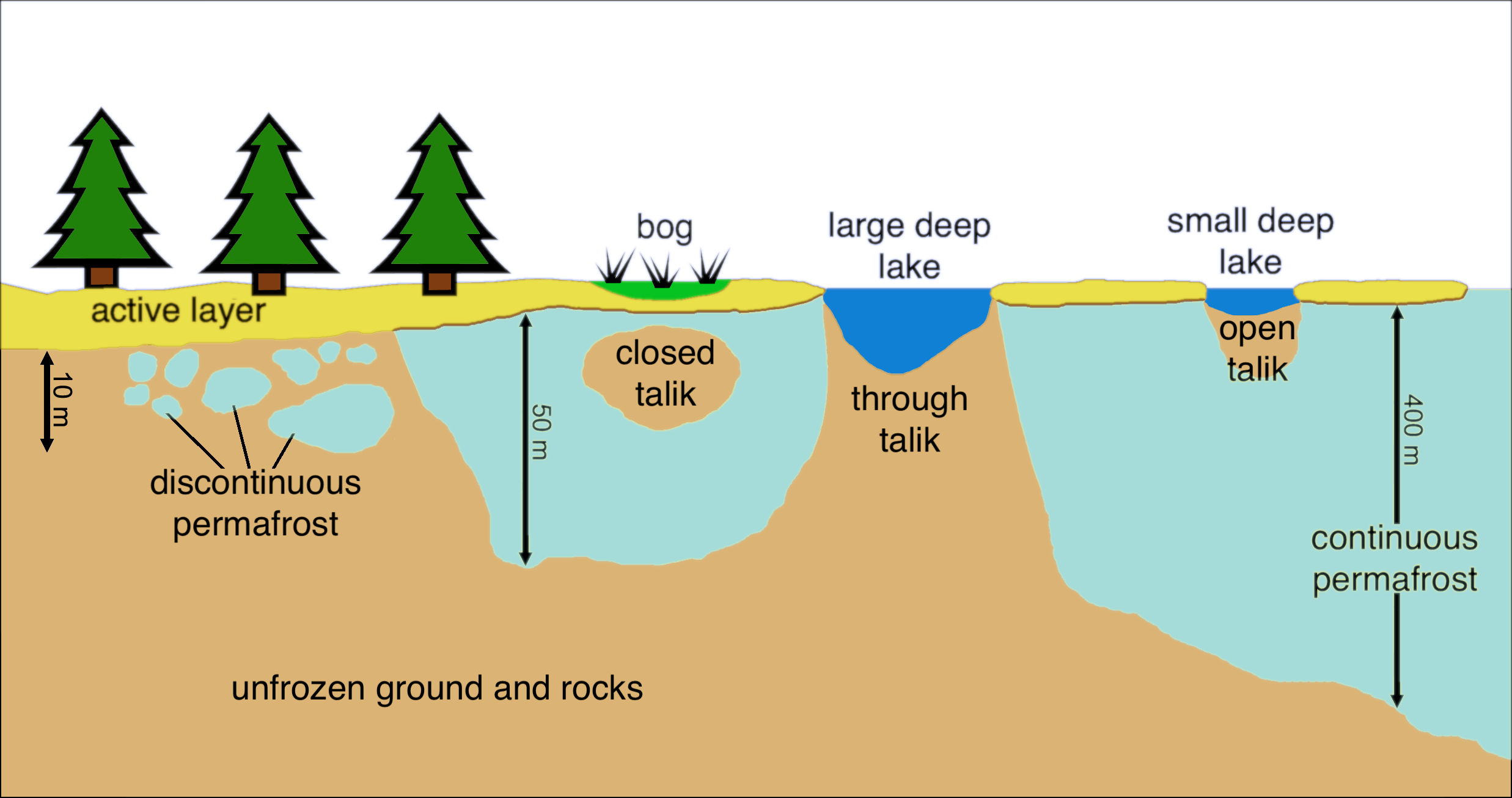
The three types of talik: closed, open and through.

A talik is a zone of year-round unfrozen ground located in the middle of a permafrost area. In regions of continuous permafrost, taliks often occur underneath shallow thermokarst lakes and rivers, where the deep water does not freeze in winter and thus the soil underneath does not freeze either. Taliks are sometimes distinguished as closed, open, or through. These terms refer to whether the talik is surrounded by permafrost, open at the top (e.g. a thermokarst lake), or open both at the top and above an unfrozen layer beneath the permafrost.

== Supra-permafrost taliks ==
Due to climate fluctuations or changes, some permafrost regions may develop an unfrozen layer between the seasonal thawing and freezing surface layer and the permafrost. This layer is called a supra-permafrost ("above the permafrost") talik; it differs from traditional taliks, which are usually associated with water bodies, in that a supra-permafrost talik occurs because the ground that thaws in summer does not fully refreeze in winter. Calculations show that climate warming induces supra-permafrost taliks in moderately cold regions. In much colder regions, warming causes a deeper summer thaw without forming a talik layer, whereas in warm, shallow permafrost regions, permafrost quickly disappears. This type of talik has recently been observed in Russia. Over time and with continued increases in air temperature or snow depth, this talik layer becomes progressively thicker, and the deep permafrost layer eventually vanishes. Findings from a scientific study suggest a more widespread occurrence of open taliks within fault zones and areas influenced by large rivers.

== See also ==
- Frost heaving – Upwards swelling of soil during freezing
- Palsa – Low frost heave in polar and subpolar climates
- Pingo – Mound of earth-covered ice
- Gas emission crater – Crater formed by permafrost gas release
