= Routine flaring =

Disposal of unwanted gas during extraction

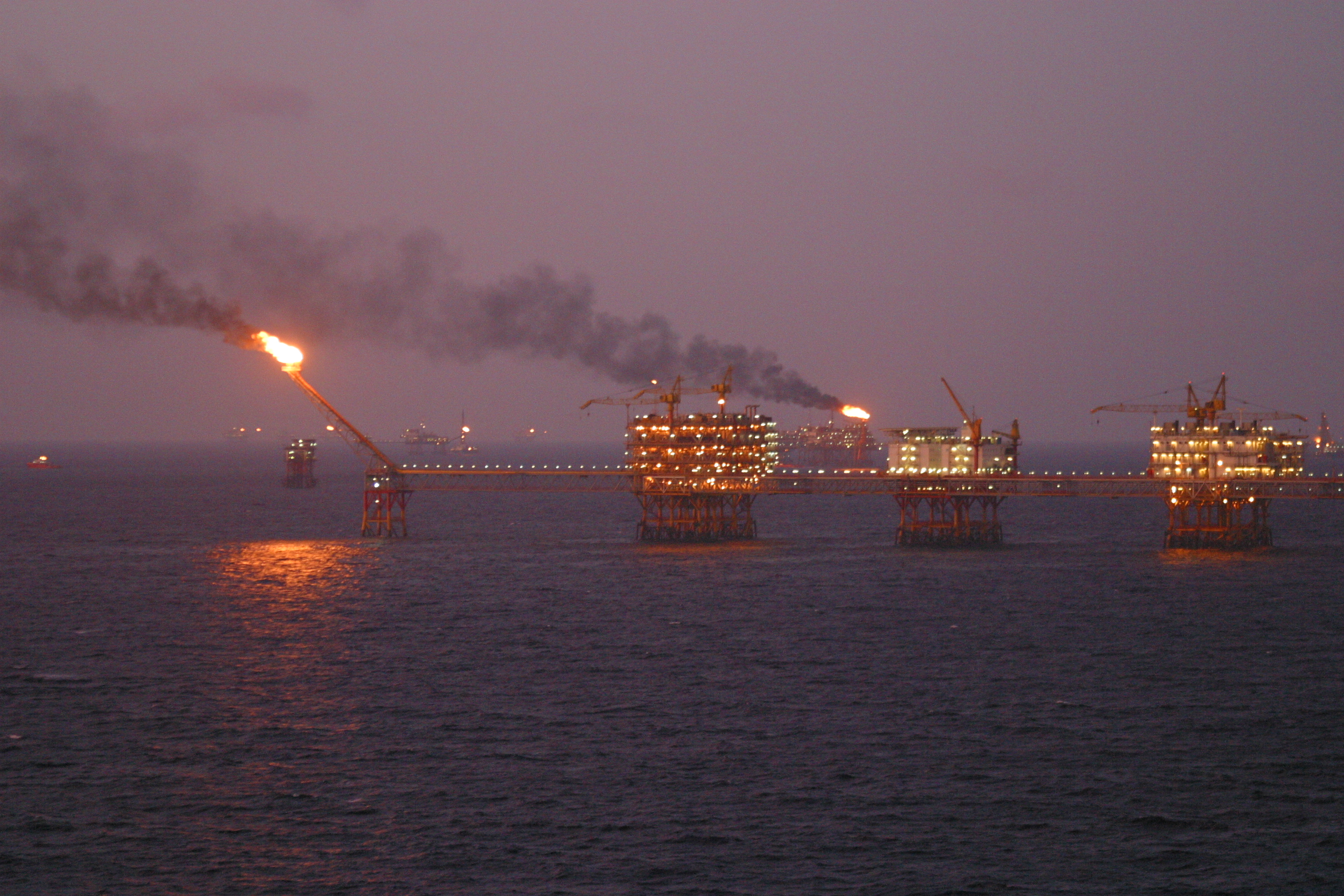
Production flaring at a crude oil extraction sites offshore from Vietnam in the South China Sea.

Routine flaring, also known as production flaring, is a method and current practice of disposing of large unwanted amounts of associated petroleum gas (APG) during crude oil extraction. The gas is first separated from the liquids and solids downstream of the wellhead, then released into a flare stack and combusted into Earth's atmosphere (usually in an open diffusion flame). Where performed, the unwanted gas (mostly natural gas dominated by methane) has been deemed unprofitable, and may be referred to as stranded gas, flare gas, or simply as "waste gas". Routine flaring is not to be confused with safety flaring, maintenance flaring, or other flaring practices characterized by shorter durations or smaller volumes of gas disposal.

Over 145 billion cubic metres (5 trillion cubic feet) of natural gas is estimated to have been flared worldwide during year 2018. The majority of this was routinely flared APG at thousands of well sites, and is a waste amount equal to the natural gas usage of South and Central America. The largest seven practitioners since 2014 are Russia, Iraq, Iran, the United States, Algeria, Venezuela and Nigeria. Activity in remote regions of Russia is greatest, with political conflict elevating the levels in other countries. The U.S. contributed nearly 10% of the 2018 world total.

Routine flaring, along with intentional gas venting and unintentional fugitive gas emissions, have profound negative consequences. The wasting of a primary resource provides no present economic or future wealth benefits, while creating liabilities through the build up of greenhouse gases and other harmful pollutants in the biosphere. With most forecasts showing oil and gas use increasing into the foreseeable future, the World Bank in 2002 launched the international Global Gas Flaring Reduction Partnership (GGFRP); a public-private partnership with the aim of retiring the wasteful practice. In 2015, it further launched the Zero Routine Flaring by 2030 Initiative; endorsed by 32 countries, 37 companies, and 15 banking institutions by the end of 2019. Endorsers based in the U.S. were the U.S. Federal Government, the State of California, and the World Bank. Global data spanning 1996–2018 indicate that flared gas volumes fell 10%, while oil production rose 40%.

== Causes ==
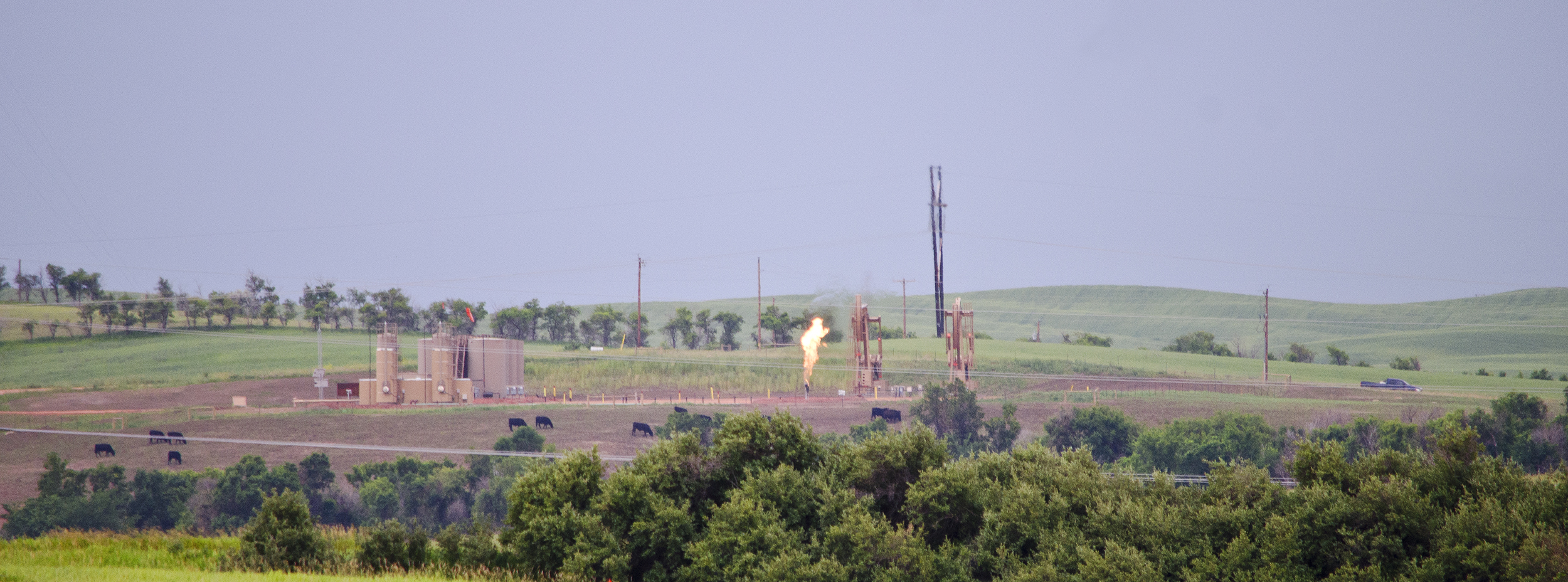
Production flaring (image centre) at a rural crude oil extraction site in North Dakota.

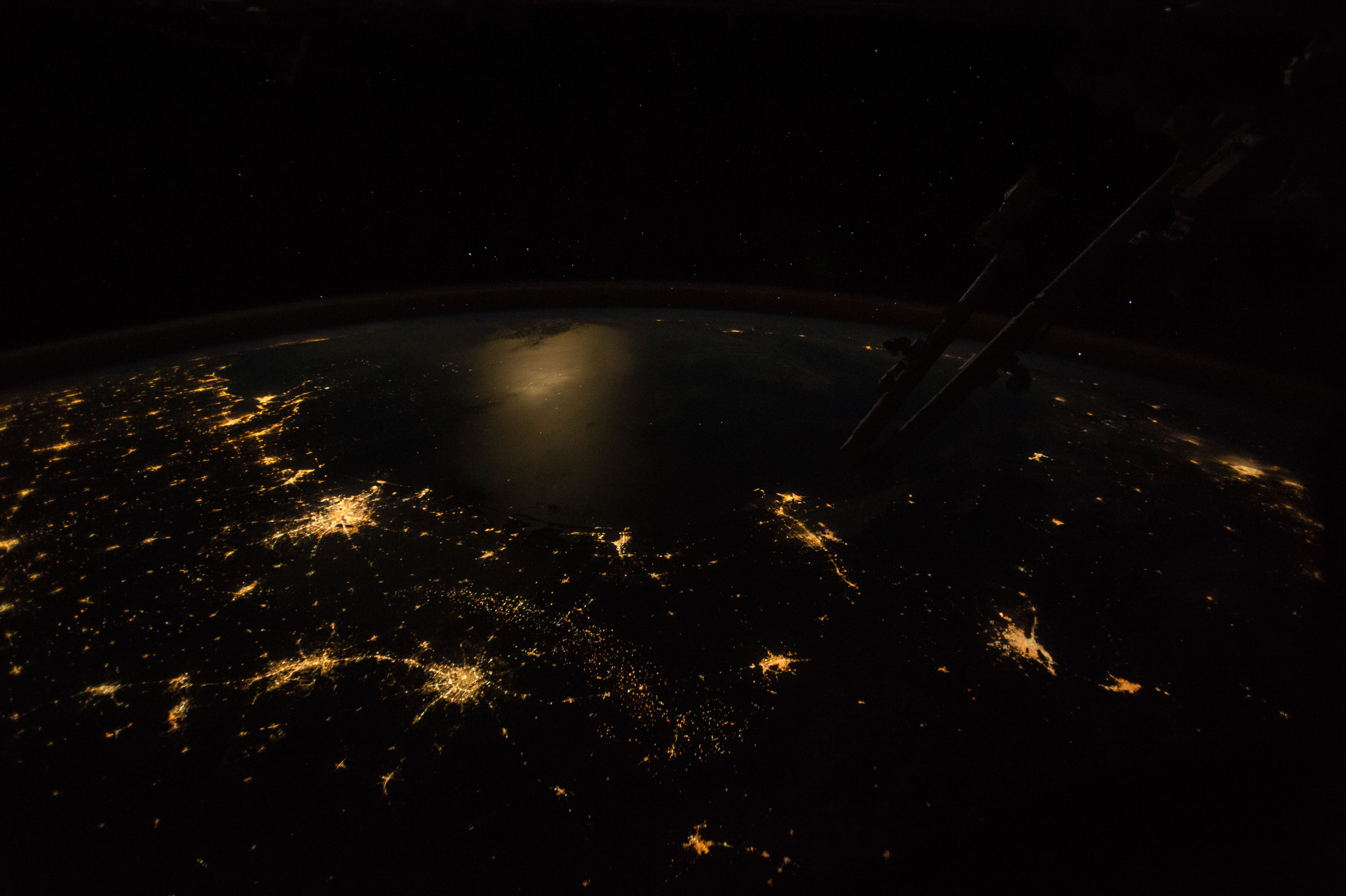
A night image from space that captures the widespread practice of routine flaring across southeast Texas. The broad arc of scattered lights extending up and left from the lower centre is defined by hundreds of gas flares from rural oil wells in the Eagle Ford Group south of San Antonio. Image taken from International Space Station, February 2015.

The routine flaring and venting of APG has been practised since the first oil wells were commercialized in the late 1850s. Although liquid and gas hydrocarbons have similar energy densities by mass, the factor of 1000 greater energy content by volume of liquid fuels makes storage and transport more economical. Widespread means for overcoming this relative disadvantage of petroleum gas have only been realized within the last several decades. For example, transcontinental gas pipelines, linked with regional collection and distribution networks, now spread throughout much of the world. Flare Gas Recovery Systems (FGRS) for processing APG into liquid or compressed fuels at the wellpad have also become increasingly mobile and varied in their capabilities.

The decision processes leading to wasting of APG in modern times depend greatly upon regional circumstances. Generally, the near-term financial and risk management objectives of decision makers will determine the outcome. Some form of permitting or other regulation of flaring and venting activity exists in most jurisdictions, but details vary widely. Factors that can increase wasting activity include (not an exhaustive list):

- rapidly expanding oil extraction into regions farther remote from the existing gas pipeline infrastructure.
- acceleration of extraction schedules driven by concerns of asset impairment.
- increased challenges in logistics, such as delays in expansions of transport capacity.
- oversupply of natural gas leading to low or negative producer prices.
- competition from lower cost and lesser contaminated sources of natural gas.
- more transitory (both temporal and geographical) nature of some oil extraction operations (e.g. tight shale oil).
- lack of on-site alternatives with sufficient agility for integration with differing operations and schedules.
- weak regulation, as caused by corruption, political conflict or political instability.

== Year 2018 statistics ==
In 2018, 100 million tonnes (145 billion cubic metres) of associated gas was flared throughout the world, representing about 3-4% of all gas produced from both oil and gas wells. The waste yielded nearly 350 million tons of CO_{2} equivalent emissions of greenhouse gases, or about 1% of the 33 billion tons of carbon dioxide (CO_{2}) released from all burning of all fossil fuels. The buildup of these gases is substantially disrupting the planetary carbon cycle, and broader international efforts are ongoing to assess the extent of the damage and quantify the accumulating economic costs.

The costs to eliminate flaring are better understood and vary widely between instances. The World Bank estimates the total mitigation cost at US$100 billion. If brought to the natural gas market in a developed economy such as that in the United States, the flared gas could supply about 17% of the 30 trillion cubic feet of U.S. consumption, and potentially be valued at nearly US$20 billion. In less developed nations, the benefits could have a further effect. For example, it could supply all current usage throughout South and Central America. If used to generate 750 billion kWh of electricity, it could supply the entire needs of the African continent.

While flaring is wasteful and produces harmful byproducts like other burning of fossil fuels, it is less disruptive in the near term than venting the associated gas which consists primarily of methane. The buildup of atmospheric methane is responsible for about 25% of the changes in climate forcing, despite its nearly 100x lower abundance compared to CO_{2}. According to the International Energy Agency, at least 75 million tons of methane was released by the oil and gas industry through venting and fugitive emissions, and an estimated 4 million tons was released through flaring inefficiencies. The use of fossil fuels by humans is responsible for about 20% of all methane emissions, and those from the oil and gas industry are responsible for about 25% of all anthropogenic sources. These sources are also in need of more extensive tracking and mitigation efforts since natural gas is projected to continue to be the most rapidly growing supply of global primary energy.

== Alternatives ==
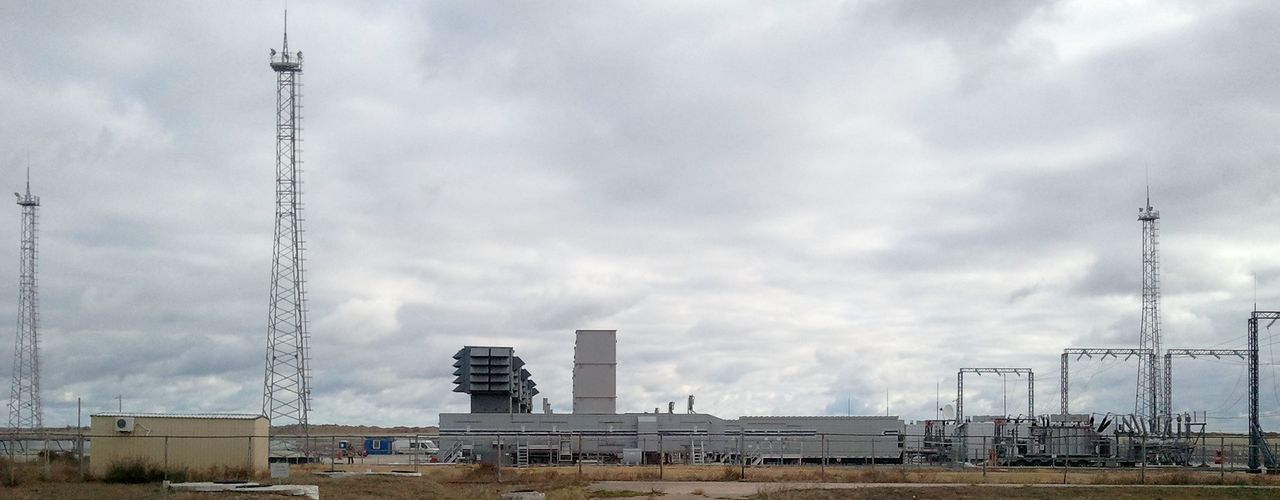
A mobile natural gas-fired power plant in Crimea.

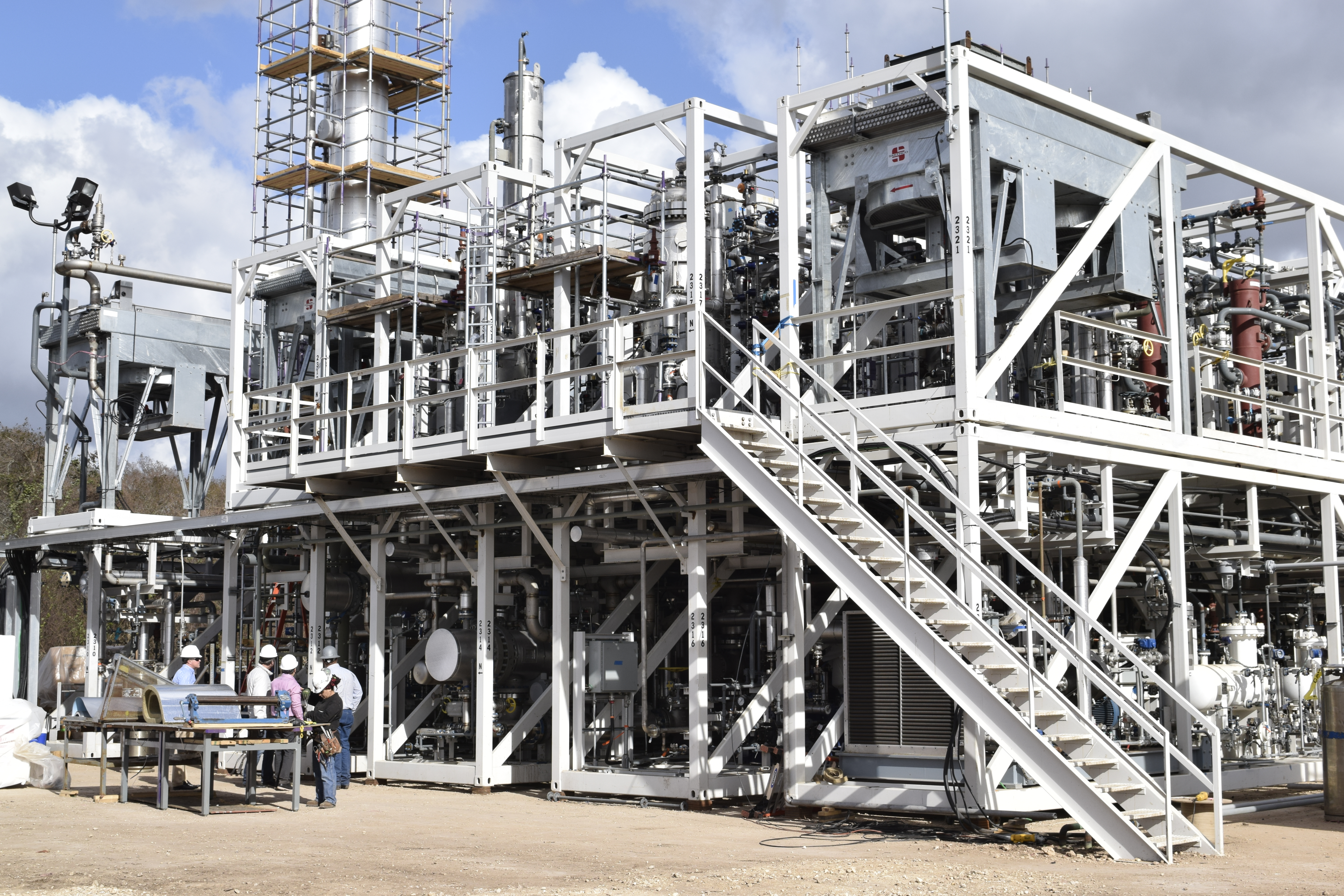
A modular, portable GTL plant outside Houston Texas. Design capacity is 100 barrels/day.

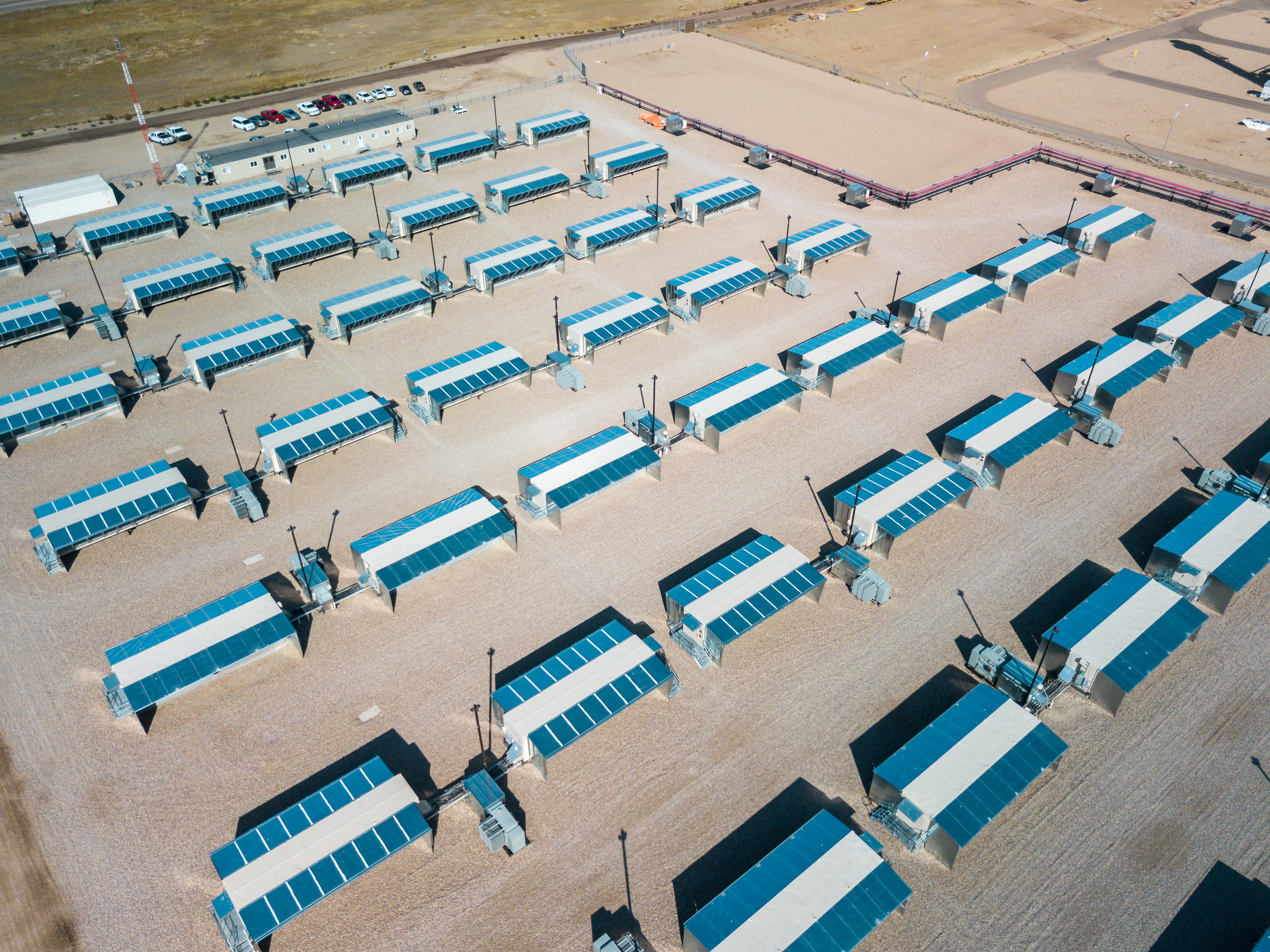
A Bitcoin mining farm powered by an adjacent upstream gas facility in Alberta Canada.

Similar to crude oil, APG is a primary energy source of both gaseous fuel and liquid fuel commodities that have high intrinsic value in the modern world economy. After APG is extracted, the remaining logistical barriers to consumption are cost-effective refinement and delivery to consumer markets. Flaring and venting alternatives preferred by the oil companies include those which remove these barriers for associated gas without impeding production of higher value oil.

=== Traditional uses ===
Global data from year 2012 indicates that 15% of all associated gas was flared or vented, while 85% was utilized or saved for the following economic benefits:

1. re-injection into the oil reservoir for secondary recovery, tertiary recovery, and/or longer-term storage. (58%)
2. transmission to a trading hub for distribution to short-term storage and refinery markets. (27%)

=== Other uses ===
The following list includes other existing commercially viable alternatives to routine flaring and venting that can be performed on-site or nearby:

1. liquid fuels production with Flare Gas Recovery Systems (FGRS) and trucking to consumption markets.

a. natural gas liquid (NGL) extraction from the flare stream using mobile equipment.
b. portable compressed natural gas (CNG) production.
c. portable liquefied natural gas (LNG) production.
d. small-scale gas to liquids (GTL) conversion.

2. electricity generation with portable engines or microturbines.
3. heat generation for water treatment or other industrial processing at the wellpad.

A 2019 report from the U.S. Department of Energy states a likely reason oil companies may be slow to embrace either existing or advanced FGRS technologies is "legal, regulated flaring is the least risky option and does not require learning how to apply new technologies or modifying existing contracts and operating practices."

Cryptocurrency "miners" have recently identified flare gas as a potential low-cost source for their energy-intensive computing. A number of partnerships have emerged between these two unusually different miners, with the further aim of minimizing each of their substantial carbon footprints.

== Effectiveness ==
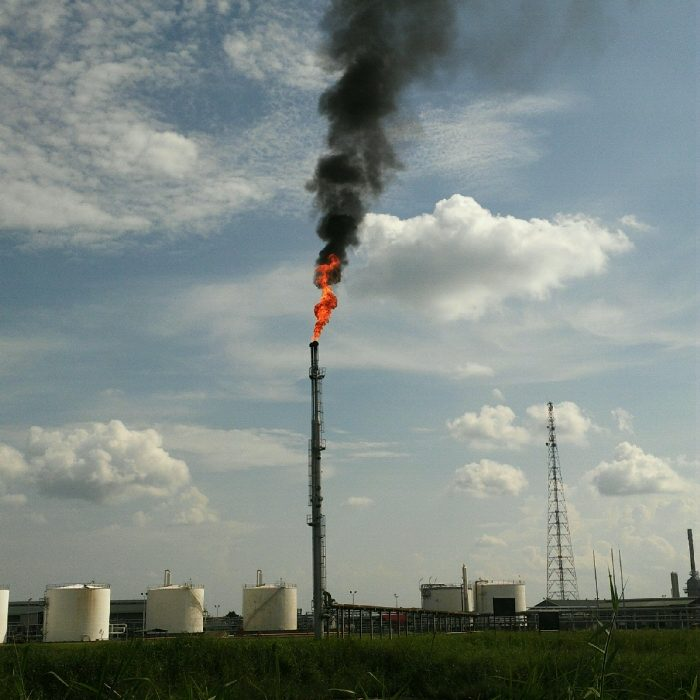
Incomplete gas flaring that vents methane and also creates black carbon at a site in Indonesia.

Gas flares using diffusion flames depend primarily on thorough air-gas mixing throughout the ejected gas stream to maximize combustion. The velocity and pressure drop of the gas as it exits the tip of the flare stack must be maintained within optimal ranges to ensure adequate turbulent diffusion. Preserving these ranges are key objectives of the engineering design process and accompanying control strategy. Significant amounts of moisture, nitrogen, carbon dioxide, or other non-hydrocarbons accompanying APG can interfere with combustion. On the other hand, properly designed and controlled injections of hot air and steam can improve combustion and effectiveness.

APG consists primarily of methane along with lesser amounts of ethane, propane, butane, and other alkanes. When a flare is operating effectively, the combustion by-products include primarily water and carbon dioxide, and small amounts of carbon monoxide and nitrous oxides (NoX). Such flares thus demonstrate high conversion efficiency, with only about 2% of APG escaping on average. When a flare is not operating effectively, more substantial amounts of APG can escape, sometimes as high 40%. Also volatile organic compounds (VOCs), toxic compounds, and other damaging pollutants can be created. VOCs and NoX can act to produce ground-level ozone at levels that exceed air quality standards. The presence of smoke indicates a poorly operating flare, and the resulting short-lived black carbon can accelerate snow and ice melting.

Most other contaminants in the APG stream occur as trace amounts. They can include toxic elements like mercury and radon that are naturally occurring. Enhanced oil recovery efforts such as hydraulic fracturing may introduce others. The common natural contaminant hydrogen sulfide enables the creation of sulfur dioxide and sulfuric acid in gas flares. At elevated concentrations, it can cause corrosion and other air quality challenges, and result in characterizations such as "sour gas" and "acid flare". As a practical matter, gas streams with higher sulfur contamination levels are more likely to be flared - where allowed - than utilized due to their lower economic value.

== Monitoring ==
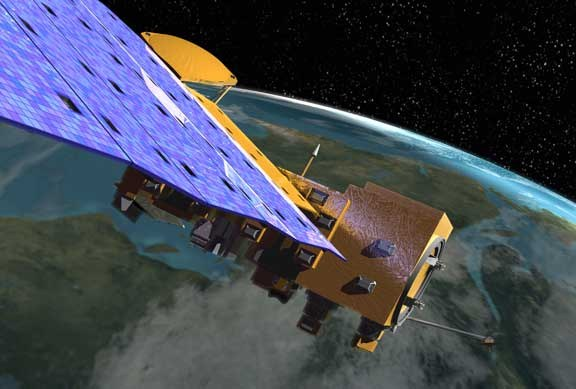
NASA's Aqua satellite

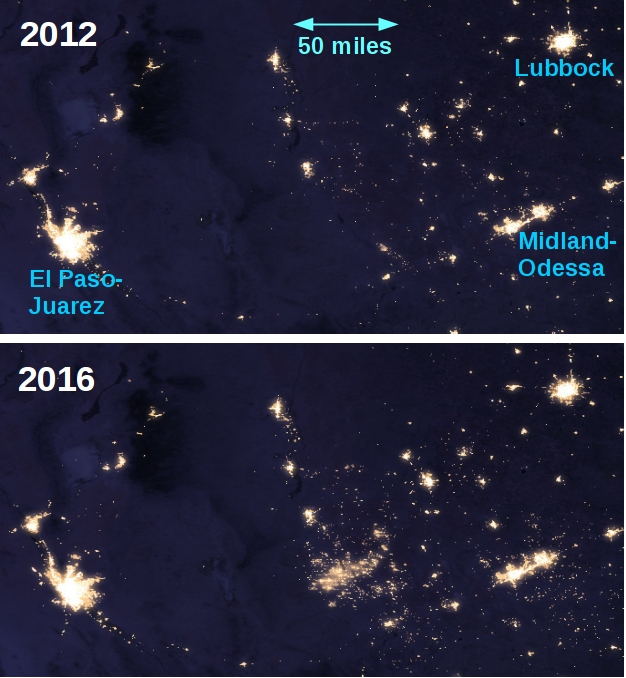
Expansion of flaring activity in Permian Basin of west Texas from 2012 to 2016. VIIRS images from NASA Earth Observatory

Available global data on gas flaring volumes are highly uncertain and unreliable until about year 1995. Following formation of the GGFR in 2002, participating researchers from NOAA and academic institutions harnessed satellite observations to simplify the data collection and improve measurement accuracy. Despite the scientific and technological advancements, amounts reported by industry participants and used by regulatory officials are still sometimes inaccurate. Quantifying and locating methane emissions from improperly operated flares, intentional gas venting activity, and other equipment methane leaks is also a high priority for the GGFR partnership, the Global Methane Initiative, and other groups that embrace both economic and environmental scope.

=== Satellite surveys ===
Since most flares are operated as open flames, volumes can be inferred during aerial surveys by measuring the amount of light emitted. The first set of global data extending back to 1995 were generated in 2006 using Defense Meteorological Satellite Program (DMSP) and Google Earth data. After about 2010, the accuracy of individual measurements was further improved to better than +/- 10% using data from the VIIRS instruments on the NOAA-20 and Suomi NPP satellites, and MODIS instruments on the Aqua and Terra satellites of the NASA Earth Observatory. The data analysis continues to be further refined with contributions from other academic and mission-specific groups. Maps of global activity are now automatically generated with advanced methods such as machine learning, and the inferred volumes adjusted for disturbances such as intermittent cloud cover. One map including such thermal activity is NASA's Fire Information for Resource Management System (FIRMS) based on data from the aforementioned satellites.

Additional satellites and instruments have, and are scheduled to continue to come online with capability to measure methane and other more powerful greenhouse gases with improving resolution. The Tropomi instrument launched in year 2017 by the European Space Agency can measure methane, sulphur dioxide, nitrogen dioxide, carbon monoxide, aerosol, and ozone concentrations in earth's troposphere at resolutions of several kilometres. The CLAIRE satellite launched in year 2016 by the Canadian firm GHGSat can resolve carbon dioxide and methane to as little as 50 metres (160 ft), thus enabling its customers to pinpoint the source of emissions.

=== Ground and aerial surveys ===
Portable instruments from suppliers like FLIR Systems and Picarro are also capable of detecting otherwise invisible leaks and emissions from improperly operating flares. They are somewhat less practical for monitoring methane and other VOC concentrations over extended periods, but can enable industry repair technicians, regulatory officials, and other investigators to locate and document sources of emissions in real time.

Researchers for the Environmental Defense Fund have extensively mapped methane emissions from oil and gas operations in the U.S. Permian Basin spanning years 2019–2020. Their results show emissions at least three times larger than those reported by operators and some degree of malfunctioning of more than 10% of flares. About half of the malfunctioning flare stacks were found to be unlit and releasing their gases with no abatement.

== Reduction progress ==
Global gas flaring and oil production trends (1996-2018) View chart definition.

The United Nations, International Energy Agency, and World Bank recognize routine flaring reduction efforts as low-hanging fruit in consideration of the substantial economic, environmental, and human-health benefits. The effects are especially large in developing countries where flaring intensity (i.e. gas flared per unit of oil produced) is often higher, due mainly to their less-developed infrastructure and markets for natural gas. Some of the key countries targeted for reductions have included Indonesia, Iraq, Kazakhstan, Mexico, Nigeria, Qatar, and the Khanty-Mansi Autonomous Okrug - Yugra region of Russia.

From 1996 through 2018, a 10% reduction in global flaring volume (measured in cubic metres - m^{3}) was realized while global oil production rose 40% (right figure). It was accompanied by a 35% reduction in global flaring intensity (measured in cubic metres per barrel oil produced - m^{3}/bbl). This was due especially in part to earlier reduction efforts in GGFR partner countries such as Russia and Nigeria. As of 2018, Canada, Brazil, and several Middle East nations flared at intensities below 1 m^{3}/bbl, compared to the global average of 4.1 m^{3}/bbl. Several African nations continue to flare at over 10 m^{3}/bbl, including Cameroon at over 40 m^{3}/bbl.

Just four nations are responsible for nearly 50% of all gas flared: Russia, Iraq, Iran, and the United States. Their flaring intensities range from about 3 to 10 m^{3}/bbl, and have not improved substantially in the last few years. Each country has extensive infrastructure and access to advanced technologies, but also complex business and political cultures that may be more resistant to change.

== Growth in the United States ==
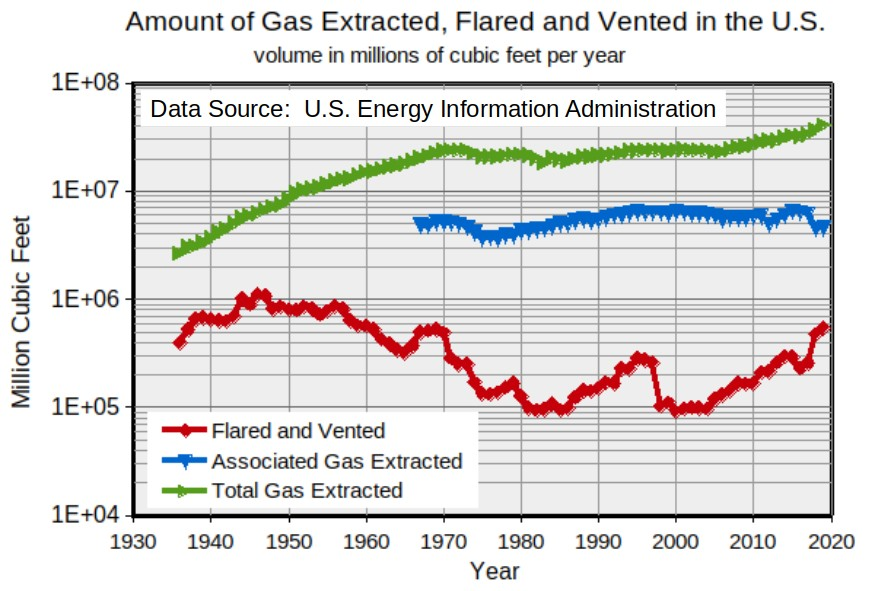
Historical chart of the volumes of gas extracted, flared and vented in the United States. Data from U.S. Energy Information Administration

Reported flaring and venting in the U.S. declined in the decades following World War II, based on data from the U.S. Energy Information Administration. Near the end of the 20th century, it reached lows close to 1.5% of APG extracted, and 0.5% of all gas extracted from both oil and gas wells.

However, since about 2005, gas flaring activity has once again been increasing, as shown in the accompanying charts. 32 states host and regulate gas flaring and/or venting. The largest volume changes since about 1990 have been in the Permian Basin of west Texas and New Mexico, the Bakken Formation of North Dakota, and the Eagle Ford Group of southeast Texas.

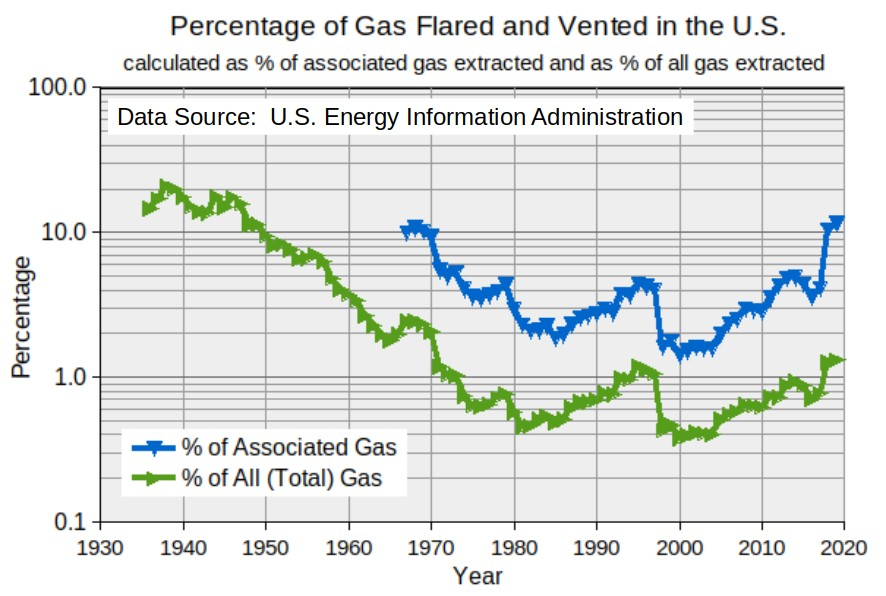
Historical chart of the percentages of gas flared and vented in the United States.

Gas flaring increased in the United States as measured both by volume and by percentage. In 2018, gas flaring reached nearly 50-year highs, with 500 billion cubic feet of gas flared, which represents 10% of APG being flared. Reports of negative producer prices for natural gas, and of a further doubling of activity in the Permian, drove continued growth in this destructive practice in 2019 in the United States. In 2018–2019, the amount of gas wasted daily in the Permian alone was capable of supplying the residential needs of the entire state of Texas. Five new long-distance gas pipelines from the region are under construction, with the first entering service in Q3 2019, and the others scheduled to come online during 2020–2022.

A loosening of U.S. federal regulations starting in 2017 enabled further increases to the waste of APG from both public and private lands. These are summarized in a June 2019 report from the U.S. Department of Energy, which identifies the most consequential changes as:

1) "the rollback of the ... limits on methane leaked, vented, or flared from oil and gas wells on federal lands"; and
2) "removing the requirement that companies seek out and repair leaks, requirements for reducing emissions from a variety or equipment elements, and requirements that companies prepare plans for minimizing waste before getting drilling permits"

== See also ==
- Natural gas in the United States
- Environmental impact of the petroleum industry
