= Wing Wah (oil company) =

Chinese company in the Republic of the Congo

Wing Wah Exploration & Production Pétrolière SAU
- Type: Private
- Industry: Oil and gas industry
- Founded: 2015
- Founder: Xiao Liangping
- Headquarters: Pointe-Noire, Republic of the Congo
- Key people: Xiao Liangping
- Products: Petroleum products (crude oil; liquefied natural gas; liquefied petroleum gas; natural gas condensate)
- Number of employees: 3000+ (2025)
- Parent: Southernpec

Wing Wah (Chinese: 永华; pinyin: yǒng huá), formally Wing Wah Exploration & Production Pétrolière SAU, founded in 2015, is a Chinese company operating in the Republic of the Congo, active in the upstream oil sector as well as in associated gas processing and commercialization. It is the Congolese subsidiary of the Chinese group Southernpec. It holds three production licenses—Banga Kayo, Cayo and Holmoni—in which it owns 85% stakes, with the remaining 15% held by the congolese national oil company, Société nationale des pétroles du Congo.

== Overview ==
=== Establishment ===
Founded in 2015, Wing Wah is a Chinese company established in the Republic of the Congo, specializing in upstream oil activities, including exploration, production and marketing of crude oil, as well as the valorization of associated gas. It is the Congolese subsidiary of the Chinese group Southernpec, which is active in maritime transport of petroleum products and in the management of oil assets internationally.

=== Organization ===
Wing Wah is led by Xiao Liangping, its founder and chairman. The company operates as a local subsidiary integrated into the Southernpec group and works closely with the SNPC for project management and gas valorization. It employs more than 3,000 local workers and develops training programs and infrastructure in operating areas.

=== Operations and licenses ===
Since its establishment, Wing Wah has entered into agreements with the Government of the Republic of the Congo and the SNPC for the operation of several production licenses.

Wing Wah holds three production licenses—Banga Kayo, Cayo and Holmoni—in which it owns 85% stakes, with SNPC holding the remaining 15%. These licenses cover strategic onshore oil production areas and include several oil fields and associated infrastructure.

The Banga Kayo license constitutes Wing Wah's main project in the Republic of the Congo, including several producing wells and facilities for the collection and processing of oil and associated gas. The Kayo and Holmoni licenses are under development.

=== Production ===
As of November 2025, Wing Wah produces approximately 58,000 barrels per day, making it the fourth-largest operator in the Republic of the Congo, behind TotalEnergies EP Congo (115,000 in 2024), Eni Congio and Perenco Congo (80,000 in 2025).

=== Associated gas processing plant ===
Wing Wah built an associated gas processing plant, inaugurated in November 2025 in the presence of the President of the Republic. This facility enables the transformation of gas into marketable products (natural gas, liquefied petroleum gas, liquefied natural gas, etc.) and contributes to the national strategy to reduce flaring while supporting local energy and industrial development. According to Vice President Li Jinqiang, the plant can process up to 5 million cubic meters of associated gas per day, producing approximately 219,000 tonnes of propane, 151,000 tonnes of butane, 88,000 tonnes of condensates and 250,000 tonnes of LNG annually, as well as a significant volume of dry gas. This butane production capacity far exceeds current national consumption, estimated at 50,000 tonnes per year, and could cover the country's entire needs.

== Outlook ==
With national production estimated at 300,000 barrels per day in 2023, the Republic of the Congo aims to reach 500,000 barrels per day by 2030. In this context, in August 2025, Wing Wah signed a $23 billion oil and gas agreement with the Congolese state covering the development of the Banga Kayo, Holmoni and Cayo licenses. The objective for these three licenses is to reach a combined production of 200,000 barrels per day by 2030 and 1.3 million barrels per day by 2050, representing a major contribution to the national target. The project is expected to generate 7,000 direct and indirect jobs.

Also in August 2025, the company entered into a strategic partnership with Airtel Congo to deploy a private telecom network at the Banga Kayo oil site. This five-year agreement is expected to contribute to the development of industrial telecommunications in Central Africa.

== See also ==
- Petroleum industry
