= Fracking in South Africa =

Fracking in South Africa is an energy production strategy at early stages of development using high-pressure drilling techniques to release natural gas trapped in shale rock. After initially imposing a moratorium on fracking in April 2011, the South African government lifted the moratorium in September 2012 after an initial investigation by an interdepartmental task team. Several energy companies were subsequently granted exploration licenses. Fracking in South Africa is a current topic of debate, with proponents pointing to substantial economic and energy benefits and opponents voicing concerns about potentially adverse environmental impacts.

== History ==
=== Shale in the Karoo ===
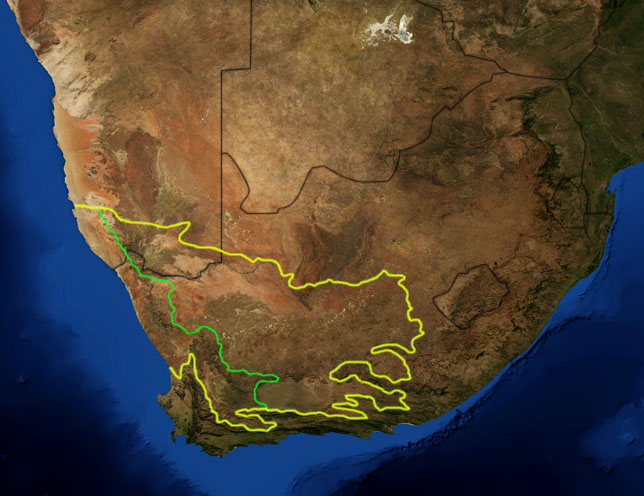
Map of the two Karoo ecoregions as delineated by the WWF on a satellite image from NASA. The yellow line encloses the two ecoregions, with the green line separating the Succulent Karoo to the west, from the Nama Karoo to the east.

The Karoo is the geographic area that is the focus of future hydraulic fracturing in South Africa, derived from a word in the local language meaning "dry". Previously a lake 275 million years ago, shale gas began to form in the low-oxygen Karoo as organic mud accumulated. As pressure increased over time, the organic material within the mud gradually turned into oil and gas trapped in shale rock. Estimates on how much gas is in the Karoo vary, with the Energy Information Administration (EIA) estimating reserves of 390 trillion cubic feet, which would make it the eighth largest reserve in the world. These figures, however, were based on desktop research and would only be refined through an extensive exploration programme In the present day, the Karoo is a semi-desert stretching over 400,000 square kilometers and home to a population of around 1 million people. The Karoo is divided into two regions: the Little Karoo, which is wet, and the Great Karoo, which is mainly desert. Because of certain exclusions, including topography and townships, around 28% of the Karoo has been estimated to be accessible to commercial development. Unique to the Karoo shale reserves is the presence of dolerite dykes intruding into targeted shale, which makes accessing the natural gas much more difficult and uncertain.

=== Government involvement ===
While commercial interest did not come until 2008, oil companies have seen potential in the Karoo since the 1960s, when companies found “gas-bearing geological formations” in the area. However, because the formations were deep underground and technology was not advanced enough to pursue such interests, commercial interest did not follow until present days. The first application for energy exploration in the Karoo came in 2008 from Bundu Oil and Gas, but was not approved. The next application from Royal Dutch Shell came in 2011, requesting 95,000 square kilometers of license rights. Vocal opposition from civil rights and environmental organisations, farmers and landowners in the Karoo lead to a government-placed moratorium on hydraulic fracturing in April 2011. Royal Dutch Shell has abandoned its application in April 2018. After assembling a task team to evaluate the potential costs and benefits of hydraulic fracking in South Africa, Collins Chabane, minister in the president’s office, announced an end to the moratorium in September 2012. Amid much debate, draft regulations for hydraulic fracturing in South Africa were published in October 2013 by South Africa’s cabinet. Mineral Resources Minister Susan Shabangu proposed a two-year extension of the moratorium in February 2014 for designated areas, not affecting applications submitted prior to the initial moratorium of 2011 and has also banned fracking until the release of final regulations before governmental elections on May 7, 2014. A news report on March 23, 2014, reported that the final regulations for hydraulic fracturing in South Africa would be released in the middle of April 2014.

In March 2014, state legislation was passed that allowed for the state to claim 100% of mining ventures, which drastically changed the 20% claim that was initially envisioned in previous negotiations. Such state control has led to concerns about the potential for business improprieties similar to those committed by Enron in the United States. Regardless of the controlling party, the exploration process will last for approximately 2 years. If results that come from the exploration process promise worthwhile benefits, environmental impacts will be assessed and commercial fracking will occur, although it could take a decade to produce result.

== Hydraulic fracturing process ==
In order to access the natural gas trapped by shale, vertical drilling is used to puncture deep boreholes to access deeply buried shale deposits. As the casings are cemented in place, horizontal drilling starts to access the production zone.

== Economic impacts ==
One of the major arguments in favor of hydraulic fracturing in South Africa is that it could bring much needed economic benefits to the country. A national unemployment rate of around 25%, with the Karoo representing many of those unemployed, offers a large incentive for allowing hydraulic fracturing in the region. Unfortunately the majority of the unemployed are also unskilled and are unlikely to receive any jobs needed for the technical drilling operations 90% of electricity in South Africa is generated using coal, which many see as unsustainable, and even coal-generated electricity is unable to reach over 10% of the population. It is expected that shale gas would serve as an additional fossil fuel and would not replace the domestic use of coal or the extraction thereof. South Africa is largely dependent on foreign imports for crude-oil needs, with 70% being imported. Eskom Holdings Ltd. produces nearly all of South Africa’s electricity, but has struggled to meet demands. South Africa has experienced rolling blackouts as a result of energy infrastructure challenges, which disrupts crucial manufacturing and mining capabilities. According to recent research, a power generating capacity of 4,800 megawatts will be needed every five years for twenty years in order to keep up with rising energy demands in South Africa.

While South Africa slowly moves towards fracking, American petroleum company Anadarko made an offshore discovery of a potentially very large natural gas reserve that could drive production in Mozambique, which could make it a potential competitor with South Africa. South Africa is already involved in Mozambique through domestic oil company Sasol, which is developing turbines powered by gas fields in the country.

The economic benefits of fracking are claimed to be potentially immense. In a controversial study commissioned and paid for by Shell, one of the applicants to explore for shale gas in South Africa, developing one tenth of the estimated Karoo for fracking could generate 200 billion rand per year and create 700,000 jobs. Some characterize fracking as a more sustainable energy solution, avoiding the costs of emitting greenhouse gases into the atmosphere, of which South Africa is considered one of the “worst offenders globally.” Proponents are eager to meet the South African promise to reduce harmful gas emissions by 34% by 2020.

== Controversy ==
Opposition to hydraulic fracturing in South Africa led to the government-imposed moratorium on fracking in 2011. Since the moratorium has been lifted, opposition has continued. This has led to ongoing debate on what regulations will be imposed, who will enforce them, and how they will be enforced. However, many opponents continue to fight for comprehensively halting shale exploration in the Karoo.

=== Economic concerns ===
Some opponents of fracking in South Africa are skeptical of the economic benefits it may have. Some analysts have argued that the complicated process of pumping, purifying, and finding necessary materials (such as sand and water) needed for fracking activity imposes too many costs to make the venture profitable. Others are skeptical of the estimates of reserve quantities, economic benefits, and job creation. While estimates by the EIA originally had the Karoo holding 485 trillion cubic feet of shale gas, new estimates from the Petroleum Agency of South Africa now state the number to be closer to 40 trillion cubic feet. A Shell-commissioned study still contends that such a number would yield returns of 9.6% of South Africa’s GDP. Farmers in the Karoo are also concerned that development in the area could damage the viability of agricultural work, disrupting the sensitive natural landscape they work in. Lastly, fracking rights are in conflict with a radio telescope planned to be placed where Shell wishes to frack. The telescope represents a $1.87 billion investment, and can only work if placed far away from industrial activity.

=== Environmental concerns ===
The main concern raised against fracking is of the environment. In order to extract the gas, water and chemicals must be blasted into the shale at high pressures. This process concerns opponents of fracking because of the potentially chemical leaks into sub-surface aquifers, which could affect thousands of hectares of land for many years. Radioactive particles could also pollute groundwater, which is already scarce in the Karoo. Proponents of the process argue that a well-maintained regulatory environment, with emergency event control protocols, would prevent environmental catastrophes from occurring. In the United States, leakage has been reported in less than 1% of wells. Proponents also argue that more casing can be used while drilling to prevent leakages and environmentally friendly chemicals have been developed to prevent leaks from being harmful to local water supplies. Finally, proponents contend that aquifers depended on for human use in the Karoo are generally shallow, while shale pockets that could be extracted from are deeper, so contamination is less likely.

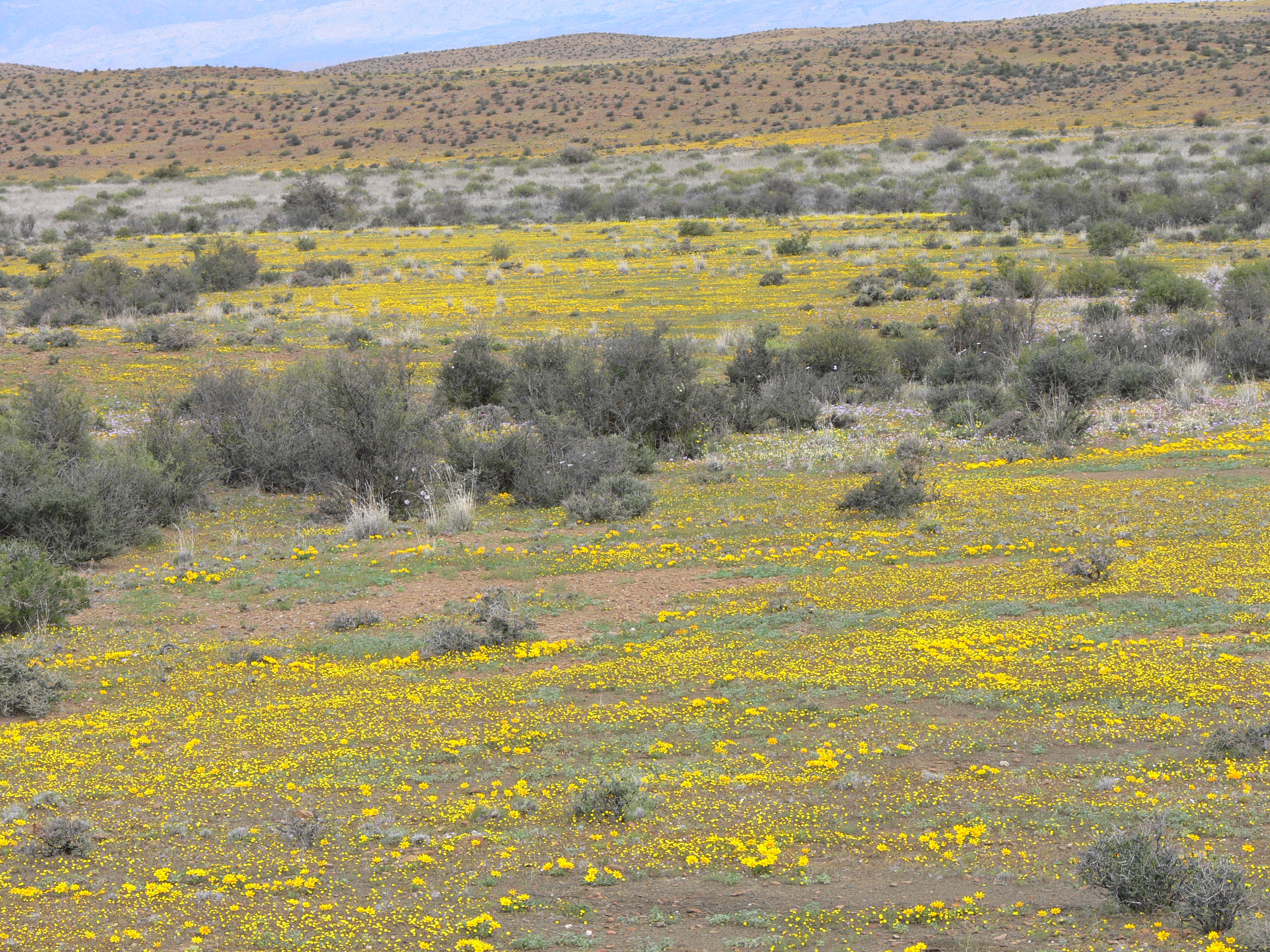
A flowering Karoo environment.

Multiple concerns about water needed for hydraulic fracturing have arisen. For the first 24 exploratory wells alone, it is estimated that 57 million gallons of water will be needed. However, low rainfall levels and high evaporation make South Africa the 30th driest country in the world, which is especially concerning to many opponents of fracking given the semi-desert environment of the Karoo. Local villages are especially vulnerable to water shortages, often depending on a small number of wells for drinking, washing, and irrigating. South Africa is projected by some to run out of water by 2025, and 95% of available fresh water was allocated by 2005. Proponents propose transporting water from areas with a surplus in the immediate area, avoiding the depletion of local supplies. Other strategies could involve piping in seawater after it has been purified or taking water from the Orange River, although these strategies have limitations. Transportation burdens existing infrastructure, and purification of seawater is costly.

Skeptics of the alleged sustainability of hydraulic fracturing have also voiced concerns. While natural gas may burn cleaner than energy sources such as coal, there is still a danger for the extraction process to release methane into the atmosphere, which is more potent than carbon dioxide. Opponents also contend that there is not enough infrastructure for natural gas extraction in South Africa to replace coal, meaning that natural gas will be exported and coal will remain the source of energy of choice domestically. Proponents are more optimistic that hydraulic fracturing will act as a bridge towards the development of other sources of renewable energy, decreasing the need for coal and oil consumption. Opponents counter that while this strategy would decrease natural gas prices and therefore carbon dioxide emissions, the lowered prices of natural gas would deter further investment into the renewable energy sector.

Further environmental concerns voiced by opponents to fracking include the potential impacts of truck congestion on and damage local road systems at great financial costs to municipalities, which could also exacerbate soil erosion on dirt roads in an already sensitive environment. Fracking could also threaten regional food security by destabilizing meat and crop production that occurs in the Karoo, which feeds some of the poorest people of South Africa. Lastly, because 40% of the plants found in the Karoo are unique to the regions, there are concerns that fracking could threaten the biodiversity of the region.

=== Cultural concerns ===
Because life in the Karoo is intimately connected with the region’s groundwater supply, many opponents of fracking are concerned with the destruction of cultural traditions if fracking were to be introduced to the region. Dr. Marie Jorritsma, an ethnomusicologist at the University of Witwatersrand, argues that there is a deep connection between the people in the Karoo and the environment itself, which is expressed through music (especially in church congregations). Focusing on the town of Kroonvale, Jorritsma contends that fracking could disrupt local water supplies, destabilizing local economic practices and forcing the abandonment of significant cultural practices. While gradual changes are tolerable by local communities, sudden and irreversible changes such as fracking might prove too difficult to adapt to. According to Jorritsma, this would leave “a static and stricken landscape and a deathly silent soundscape.”
