= Stranded gas =

Natural gas field that is isolated from market

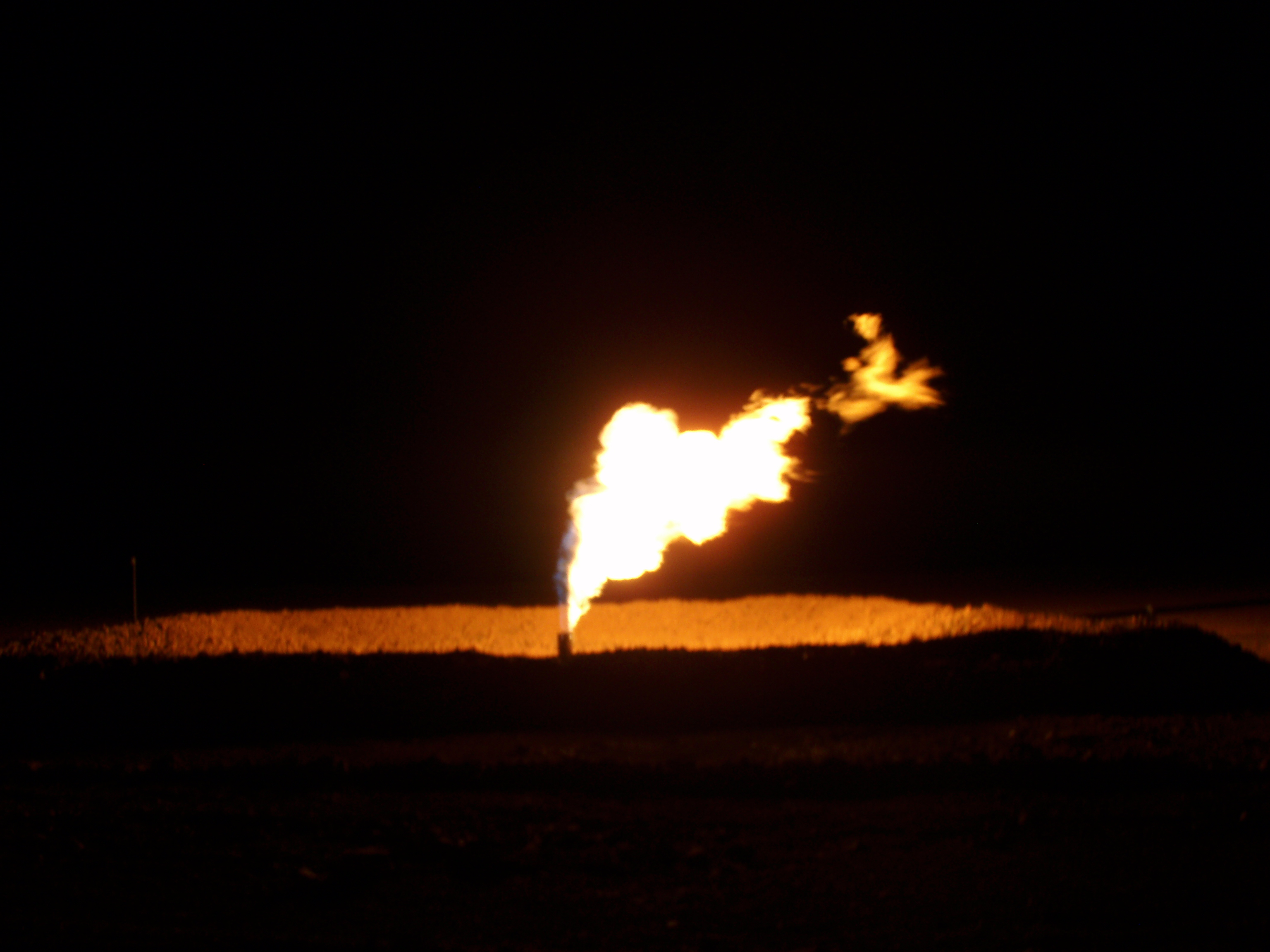
Stranded gas is flared extensively worldwide.

Stranded gas is any natural gas field that has been discovered, but remains unusable for either physical or economic reasons.

Gas found in an oil well is generally called associated gas rather than stranded gas, but some flared gases from oil wells are stranded gases that are unusable due to economic reasons.

== Economically stranded gas ==
Methane is the dominant component of natural gas.

A volume of gas can be economically stranded because it is remote from a market for natural gas, making construction of a pipeline prohibitively expensive. Gases are expensive to transport over long distances, especially on scale. One obvious solution to this problem is to convert the gas (mainly methane) into liquid fuels such as methanol, which would be easier to transport. Despite intensive efforts, methods for the conversion of methane to methanol have not been established. The crux of the problem is that the partial oxidation of methane to methanol is rapidly followed by further oxidation of methanol to carbon dioxide, i.e. complete combustion. John Kerry said in 2022 that new investments in gas exploration and production - such as in Africa - risked stranding.

== Physically stranded gas ==
A gas field that is too deep to drill for, or is beneath an obstruction, may be considered physically stranded. Continuous development of drilling technology provides access to many difficult-to-access fields.

== Locations of stranded gas ==
=== Alaska ===
Alaska has a large resource of natural gas stranded in its Prudhoe Bay oil field. The largest gas plant in the United States exists there exclusively to reinject the associated gas into the oil fields. Marketing of the gas awaits the completion of the Alaska gas pipeline to carry it to the lower 48 states. Building of the pipeline has been delayed by the availability of low-cost natural gas in Canada and development of non-conventional gas fields in the lower 48 states, as well as political considerations.

=== Canada ===
Canada has a large amount of stranded gas in its Arctic Islands, Beaufort Sea, and Mackenzie Delta. Marketing of this gas would require completion of the Mackenzie Valley Pipeline to bring it south along the Mackenzie River. Some companies would like to combine it with Alaska gas by building a pipeline offshore in the Arctic Ocean from Alaska to the Mackenzie Delta. The government of Alaska is resisting such option because it would prefer to bring the gas first to southern Alaska, and then transport it across the Yukon along the Alaska Highway. In either case, the pipeline would feed into the continental distribution system in northern Alberta.

=== Russia ===
Russia, which has the world's largest natural gas reserves, has much natural gas stranded in Siberia. In some cases, the easiest way to bring it to market would be south to China. Another alternative would be to build liquefied natural gas (LNG) terminals at Siberian ports, where it could be shipped to any port in the world with an LNG regasification terminal.

== See also ==
- Routine flaring
- Gas to liquid
