= Southernpec =

Chinese oil and shipping company

Southernpec (Southern Petrochemical) is a Chinese oil and shipping company. Sinopec is a minority shareholder.

Souternpec transports and stores oil products using its ships. The company acquired its first VLCC in 2009.

Its Wing Wah subsidiary developed and operates the Banga Kayo oil field in the Republic of Congo, with a production of 58,000 barrels per day in november 2025. The Banga Kayo oil field is one of the projects credited with rejuvenating oil production in the Republic of Congo, which had been in decline before 2016.
