= Health and environmental impact of the petroleum industry =

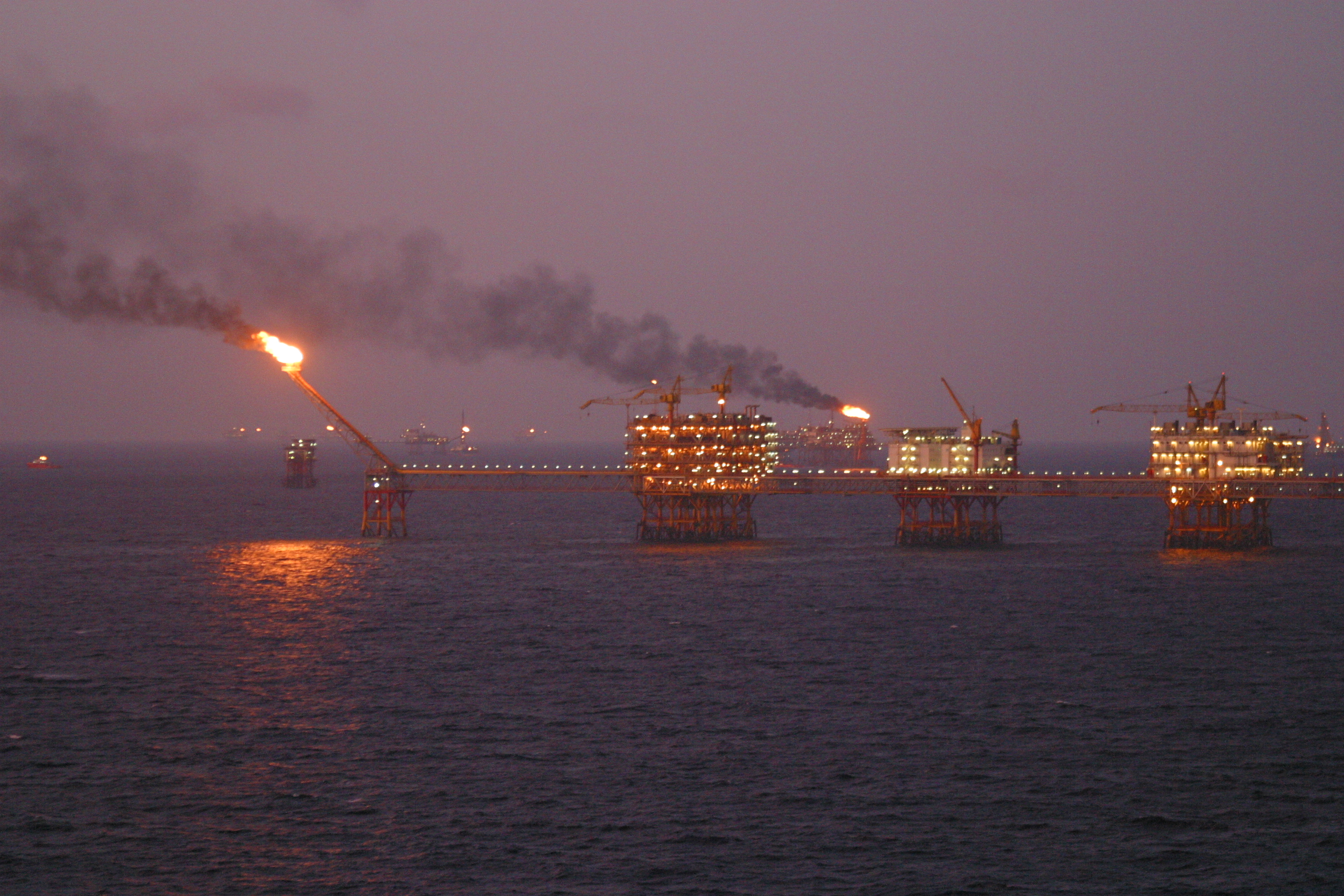
Flaring of gas from offshore oil extraction platforms

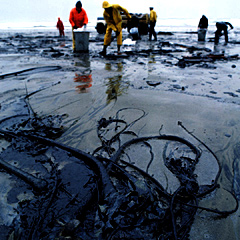
A beach after an oil spill

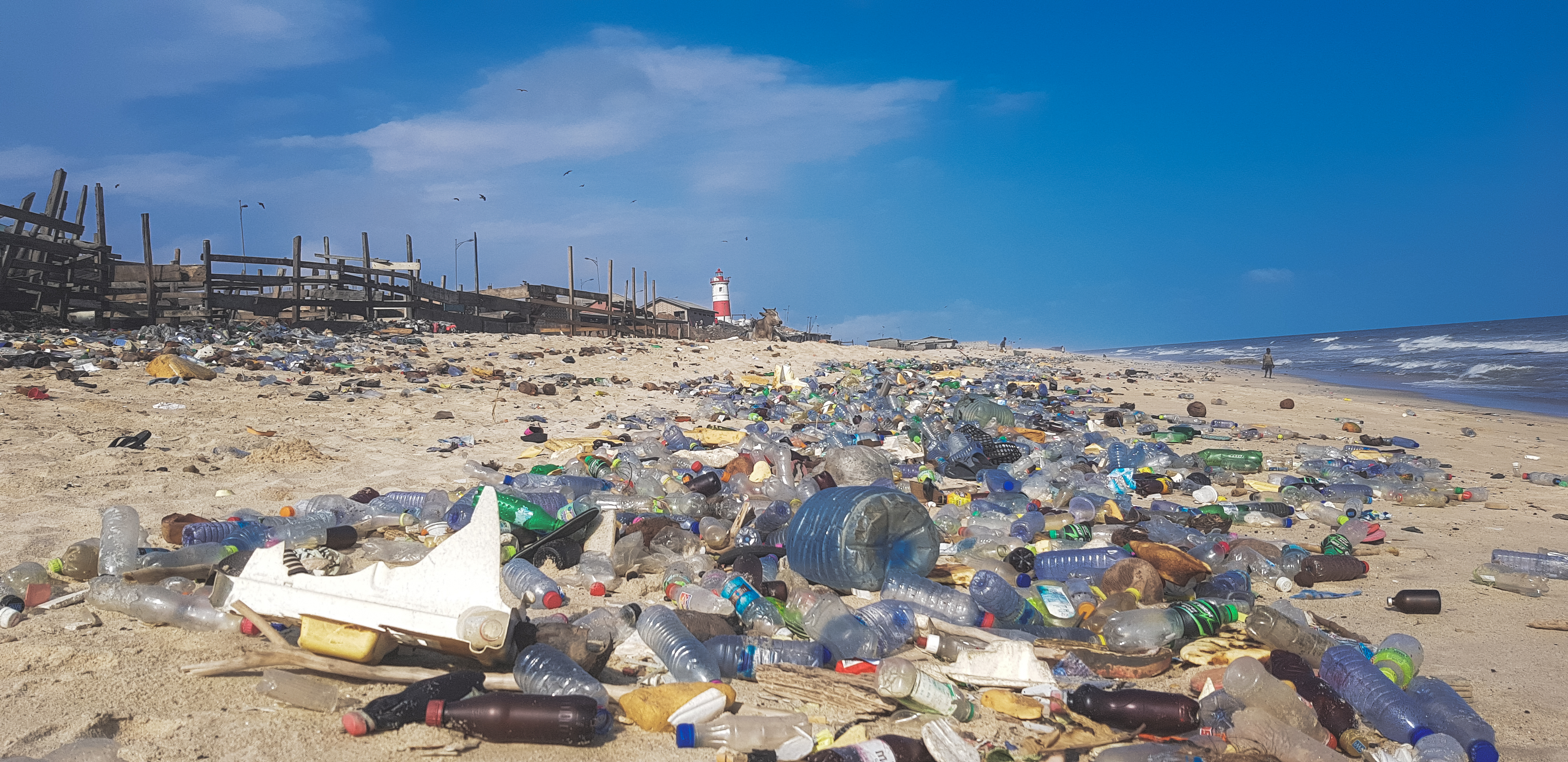
Accumulation of plastic waste on a beach

The environmental impact of the petroleum industry is extensive and expansive due to petroleum having many uses. Crude oil and natural gas are primary energy and raw material sources that enable numerous aspects of modern daily life and the world economy. Their supply has grown quickly over the last 150 years to meet the demands of the rapidly increasing human population, creativity, knowledge, and consumerism.

Substantial quantities of toxic and non-toxic waste are generated during the extraction, refinement, and transportation stages of oil and gas. Some industry by-products, such as volatile organic compounds, nitrogen & sulfur compounds, and spilled oil can pollute the air, water and soil at levels that are harmful to life, when improperly managed. Climate warming, ocean acidification, and sea level rise are global changes enhanced by the industry's emissions of greenhouse gases like carbon dioxide (CO_{2}) and methane, and micro-particulate aerosols like black carbon. Vehicle tailpipe emissions kill many people.

Among all human activities, fossil fuel combustion is the largest contributor to the ongoing buildup of carbon in the Earth's biosphere. The International Energy Agency and others report that oil & gas use comprises over 55% (18 billion tons) of the recorded 32.8 billion tons (BT) of CO_{2} released into the atmosphere from all energy sources in year 2017. Coal use comprised most of the remaining 45%. Total emissions continue to rise nearly every year: from 1.7% to 33.1 BT in 2018.

Through its operations, the petroleum industry directly contributed about 8% (2.7 BT) of the 32.8 BT in 2017. Also, due to its intentional and other releases of natural gas, the industry directly contributed at least 79 million tons of methane (2.4 BT CO_{2}-equivalent) that same year; an amount equal to about 14% of all known anthropogenic and natural emissions of the potent warming gas.

Along with fuels like gasoline and liquefied natural gas, petroleum enables many consumer chemicals and products, such as fertilizers and plastics. Most alternative technologies for energy generation, transportation, and storage can only be realized at this time because of its diverse usefulness. Conservation, efficiency, and minimizing waste impacts of petroleum products are effective industry and consumer actions toward achieving better environmental sustainability.

On November 12, 2025, 2 billion people live within 5 km of more than 18,000 operating fossil fuel infrastructure sites distributed across 170 countries around the world, while 463 million are living within 1 km of the sites exposing them to much higher environmental and health risks. In total, 2.463 billion people live within 1 km-5 km of 18,000 fossil fuel sites in 170 countries. Adding 3,500 fossil fuel sites built globally to 21,500 global fossil fuel sites, would increase by 135 million people to 2.6 billion people.

== General issues ==
=== Toxic compounds ===
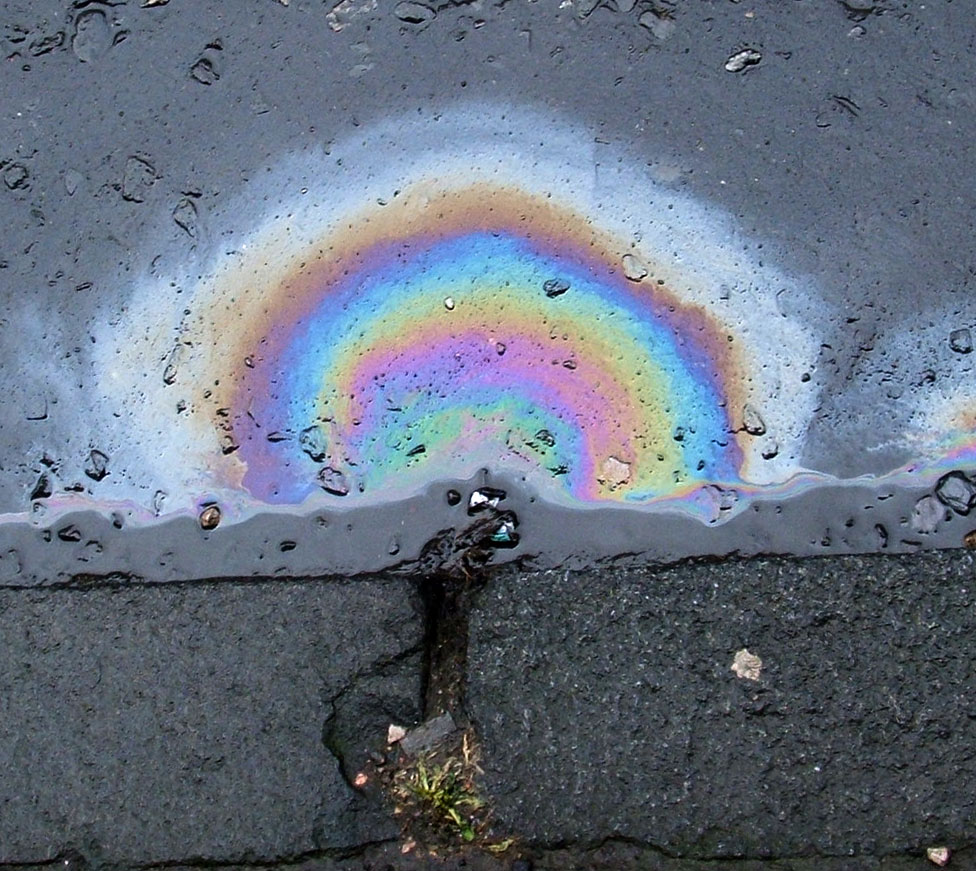
Petroleum distillates can create a sheen on the surface of water as a thin layer creating an optical phenomenon called interphase.

Petroleum is a complex mixture of many components . These components include straight chained, branched, cyclic, monocyclic aromatic and polycyclic aromatic hydrocarbons. The toxicity of oils can be understood using the toxic potential or the toxicity of each individual component of oil at the water solubility of that component. There are many methods that can be used to measure the toxicity of crude oil and other petroleum related products. Certain studies analyzing levels of toxicity can use the target lipid model or colorimetric analysis using colored-dyes in order to assess toxicity and biodegradability.

Different oils and petroleum-related products have different levels of toxicity. Levels of toxicity are influenced by many factors such as weathering, solubility, as well as chemical properties such as persistence. Increased weathering tends to decrease levels of toxicity as more soluble and lower molecular weight substances are removed. Highly soluble substances tend to have higher levels of toxicity than substances that are not very soluble in water. Generally oils that have longer carbon chains and with more benzene rings have higher levels of toxicity. Benzene is the petroleum-related product with the highest level of toxicity. Other substances other than benzene which are highly toxic are toluene, methylbenzene and xylenes (BETX). Substances with the lowest toxicity are crude oil and motor oil.

Despite varying levels of toxicity amongst different variants of oil, all petroleum-derived products have adverse impacts on human health and the ecosystem. Examples of adverse effects are oil emulsions in digestive systems in certain mammals might result in decreased ability to digest nutrients that might lead to death of certain mammals. Further symptoms include capillary ruptures and hemorrhages. Ecosystem food chains can be affected due to a decrease in algae productivity therefore threatening certain species. Oil is "acutely lethal" to fish – that is, it kills fish quickly, at a concentration of 4000 parts per million (ppm) (0.4%). The toxicity of petroleum related products threaten human health. Many compounds found in oil are highly toxic and can cause cancer (carcinogenic) as well as other diseases. Studies in Taiwan link proximity to oil refineries to premature births. Crude oil and petroleum distillates cause birth defects.

Benzene is present in both crude oil and gasoline and is known to cause leukaemia in humans. The compound is also known to lower the white blood cell count in humans, which would leave people exposed to it more susceptible to infections. "Studies have linked benzene exposure in the mere parts per billion (ppb) range to terminal leukaemia, Hodgkin's lymphoma, and other blood and immune system diseases within 5–15 years of exposure."

Fossil gas and oil naturally contain small amounts of radioactive elements which are released during mining. High concentration of these elements in brine is a technological and environmental concern.

Oil and gasoline toxic waste compounds can be heavily generated during all forms of exploration, production, transportation, refining, processing, distributing, and consumption. The common petroleum waste characteristic can be toxic, ignitable, corrosive, reactive, and volatile.

=== Greenhouse gases ===
Carbon dioxide emissions and partitioning

Emissions of CO_{2} have been caused by different sources ramping up one after the other (per the Global Carbon Project).

Partitioning of CO_{2} emissions show that most emissions are being absorbed by carbon sinks, including plant growth, soil uptake, and ocean uptake (Global Carbon Project)

Petroleum extraction disrupts the equilibrium of earth's carbon cycle by transporting sequestered geologic carbon into the biosphere. The carbon is used by consumers in various forms and a large fraction is combusted into the atmosphere; thus creating massive amounts of the greenhouse gas, carbon dioxide, as a waste product. Natural gas (mostly methane) is an even more potent greenhouse gas when it escapes into the atmosphere prior to being burned.

Since the industrial age began circa 1750–1850 with growing wood and coal use, the atmospheric concentration of carbon dioxide and methane have increased about 50% and 150%, respectively, above their relatively stable levels of the prior 800,000+ years. Each is currently increasing at a rate of about 1% every year, since about half of the added carbon has been absorbed by Earth's land vegetation and ocean sinks. The growth in annual emissions has also been so rapid that the total amount of fossil carbon extracted in the last 30 years exceeds the total amount extracted during all prior human history.

=== Microplastics ===
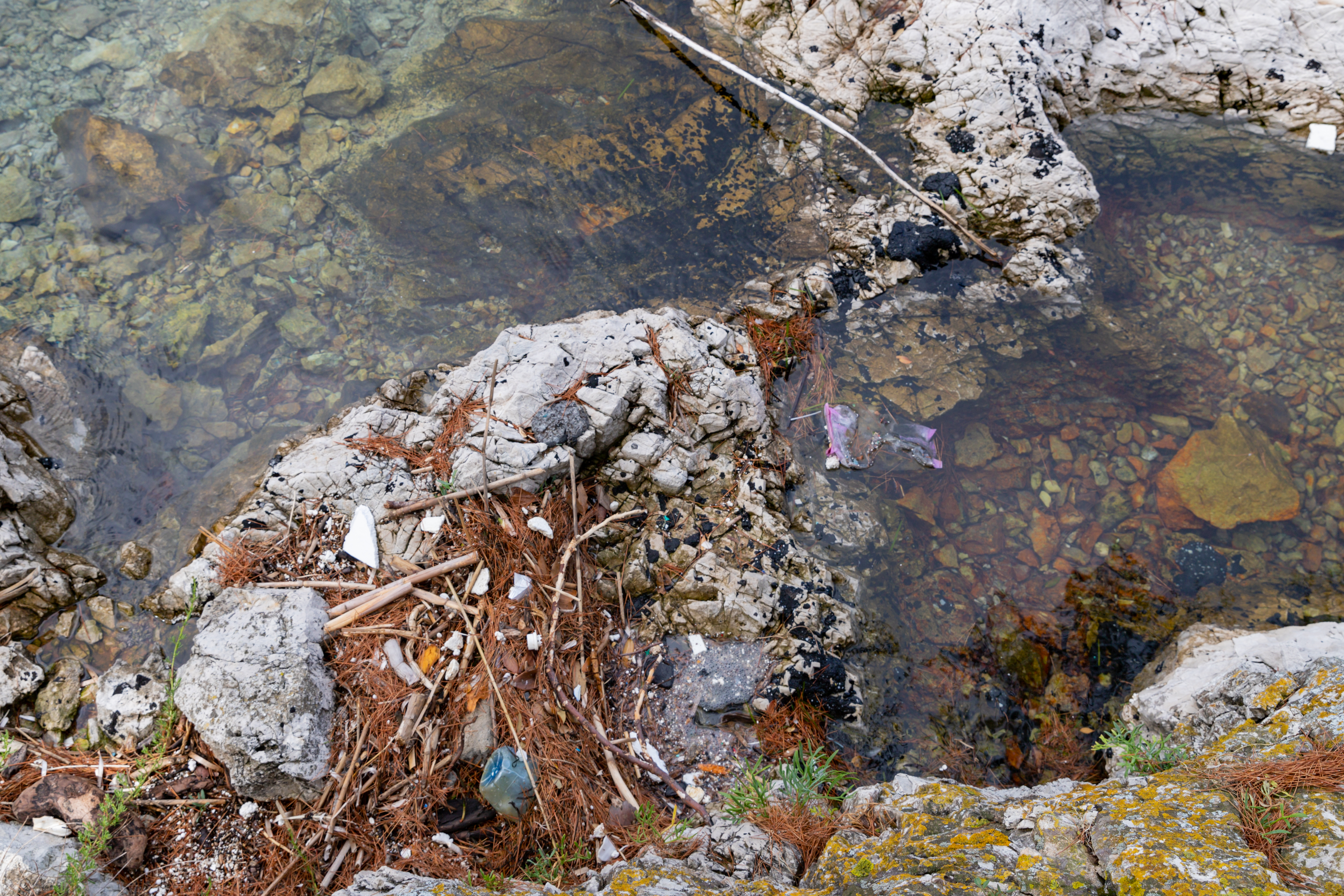
Microplastics in Mljet National Park, Croatia

Petroleum has enabled plastics to be used to create a wide range and massive quantity of consumer items at extremely low production costs. Annual growth rates in production have been near 10%, and are driven largely by single-use plastics for which improper disposal is common.

The majority of plastic is not recycled, and it fragments into smaller and smaller pieces over time. Microplastics are particles that are smaller than 5 mm in size. Microplastics are observable in air, water, and soil samples gathered from nearly every location on earth's surface, and also increasingly within biological samplings. Long-term effects from the environmental buildup of plastic waste are under scientific evaluation but thus far mostly unknown. Microplastics are concern because they have a tendency to adsorb pollutants on their surface, as well as an ability to bioaccumulate.

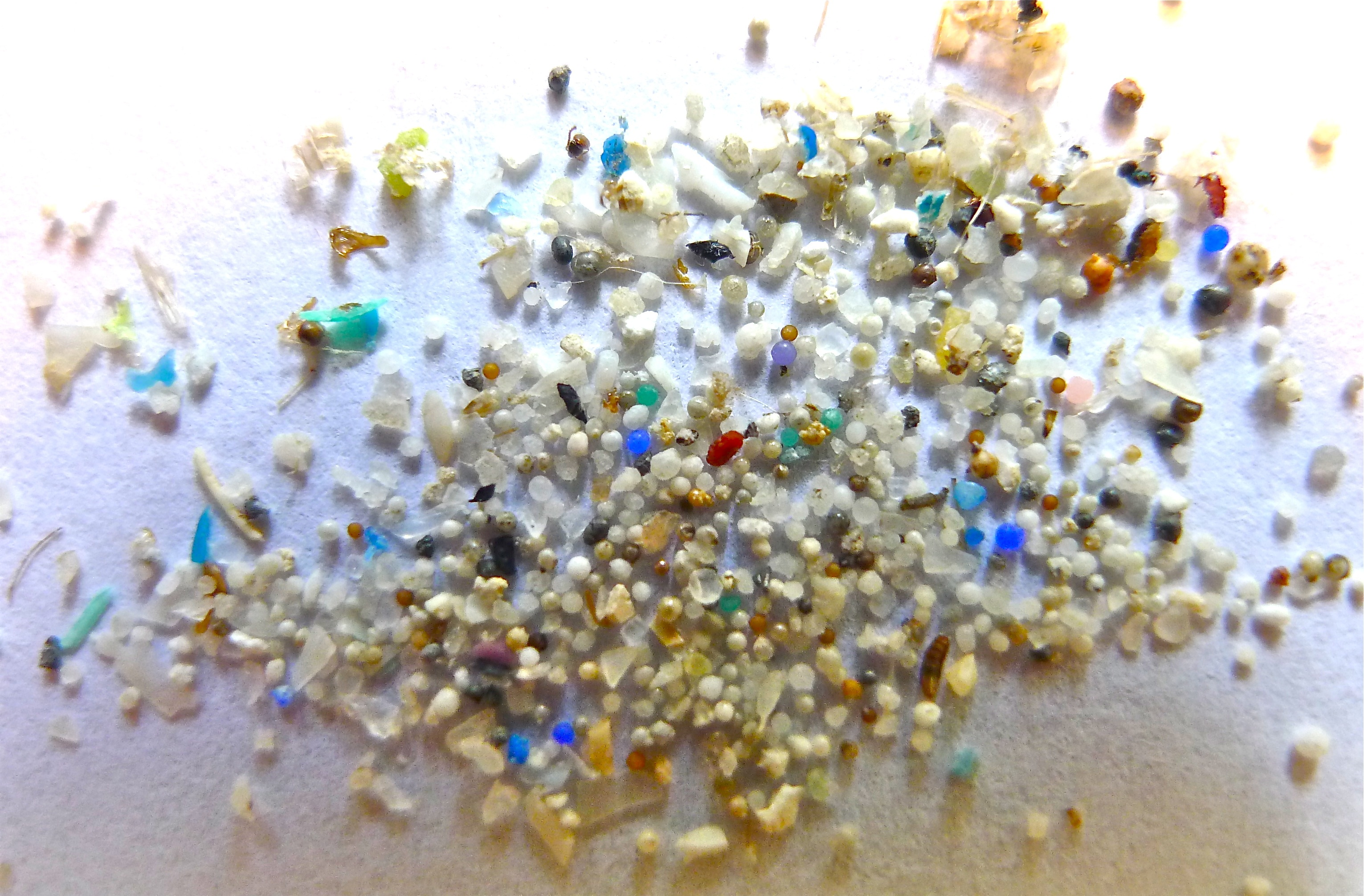
Microplastics can be found in the ocean and marine habitats.

When particles are ingested by marine organisms they usually end up in tissues such as the digestive glands, circulatory system, gills and guts. When these organisms are consumed and shifted upwards in the food chain, they end up creating an exposure risk towards bigger organisms and ultimately humans. Microplastics possess many risks to various organisms. They are known to disrupt algal feeding, increase mortality and lower fertility in copepods. Amongst mussels, microplastics are known to interrupt filtration and induce inflammatory responses. There is still a lack of data in how these particles ultimately affect humans because most marine organisms are gutted before consumed. In spite of that, their environmental effects are well documented and the extent of their damage is well understood.

== Local and regional impacts ==
Deaths caused by use of fossil fuels such as oil (areas of rectangles in chart) greatly exceed those resulting from production of renewable energy (rectangles barely visible in chart).

Some harmful impacts of petroleum can be limited to the geographic locations where it is produced, consumed, and/or disposed. In many cases, the impacts may be reduced to safe levels when consumers practice responsible use and disposal. Producers of specific products can further reduce the impacts through life cycle assessment and environmental design practices.

=== Air pollution ===
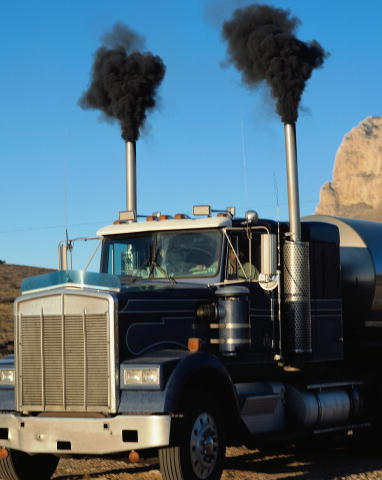
Petroleum diesel exhaust from a truck

==== Exhaust emissions ====
Emissions from the petroleum industry occur in every chain of the oil-producing process from the extraction to the consumption phase . In the extraction phase, gas venting and flaring release not only methane and carbon dioxide, but various other pollutants like nitrous oxides and aerosols. Certain by-products include carbon monoxide and methanol. When oil or petroleum distillates are combusted, usually the combustion is not complete and the chemical reaction leaves by-products which are not water or carbon dioxide. However, despite the large amounts of pollutants, there is variation in the amount and concentration of certain pollutants. In the refinement stages of petroleum also contributes to large amounts of pollution in urban areas. This increase in pollution has adverse effects on human health due to the toxicity of oil. A study investigating the effects of oil refineries in Taiwan. The study found an increased occurrence of premature births in mothers that lived in close proximity to oil refineries than mothers who lived away from oil refineries. There were also differences observed in sex ratios and the birth weight of the children. Also, fine particulates of soot blacken humans' and other animals' lungs and cause heart problems or death. Soot is cancer causing (carcinogenic)

==== Vapor intrusion ====
Volatile organic compounds (VOCs) are gases or vapours emitted by various solids and liquids. Petroleum hydrocarbons such as gasoline, diesel, or jet fuel intruding into indoor spaces from underground storage tanks or brownfields threaten safety (e.g., explosive potential) and causes adverse health effects from inhalation.

=== Acid rain ===
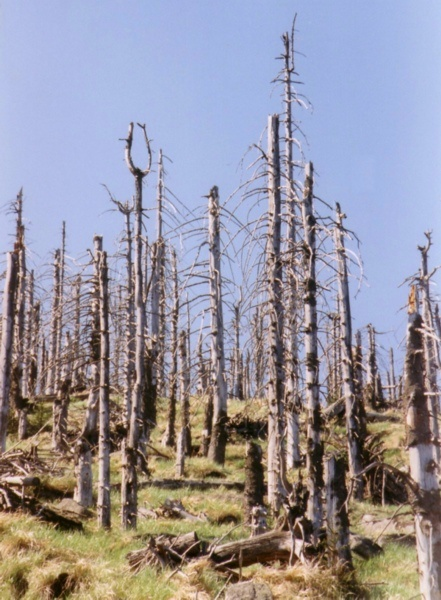
Trees killed by acid rain, an unwanted side effect of burning petroleum

The combustion process of petroleum, coal and wood is responsible for increased occurrence of acid rain. Combustion causes an increased amount of nitrous oxide, along with sulfur dioxide from the sulfur in the oil. These by-products combine with water in the atmosphere to create acid rain. The increased concentrations of nitrates and other acidic substances have significant effects on the pH levels of rainfall. Data samples analyzed from the United States and Europe from the past 100 years and showed an increase in nitrous oxide emissions from combustion. The emissions were large enough to acidify the rainfall. The acid rain has adverse impacts on the larger ecosystem. For example, acid rain can kill trees, and can kill fish by acidifying lakes. Coral reefs are also destroyed by acid rain. Acid rain also leads to the corrosion of machinery and structures (large amounts of capital) and to the slow destruction of archeological structures like the marble ruins of Rome and Greece.

=== Oil spills ===
An oil spill is the release of a liquid petroleum hydrocarbon into the environment, especially marine areas, due to human activity, and is a form of pollution. The term is usually applied to marine oil spills, where oil is released into the ocean or coastal waters, but spills may also occur on land. Oil spills may be due to releases of crude oil from tankers, pipelines, railcars, offshore platforms, drilling rigs and wells, as well as spills of refined petroleum products (such as gasoline, diesel) and their by-products, heavier fuels used by large ships such as bunker fuel, or the spill of any oily refuse or waste oil.

Major oil spills include, Lakeview Gusher, Gulf War oil spill, and the Deepwater Horizon oil spill. Spilt oil penetrates into the structure of the plumage of birds and the fur of mammals, reducing its insulating ability, and making them more vulnerable to temperature fluctuations and much less buoyant in the water. Cleanup and recovery from an oil spill is difficult and depends upon many factors, including the type of oil spilled, the temperature of the water (affecting evaporation and biodegradation), and the types of shorelines and beaches involved. Other factors influencing the rate of long-term contamination is the continuous inputs of petroleum residues and the rate at which the environment can clean itself Spills may take weeks, months or even years to clean up.

=== Waste oil ===
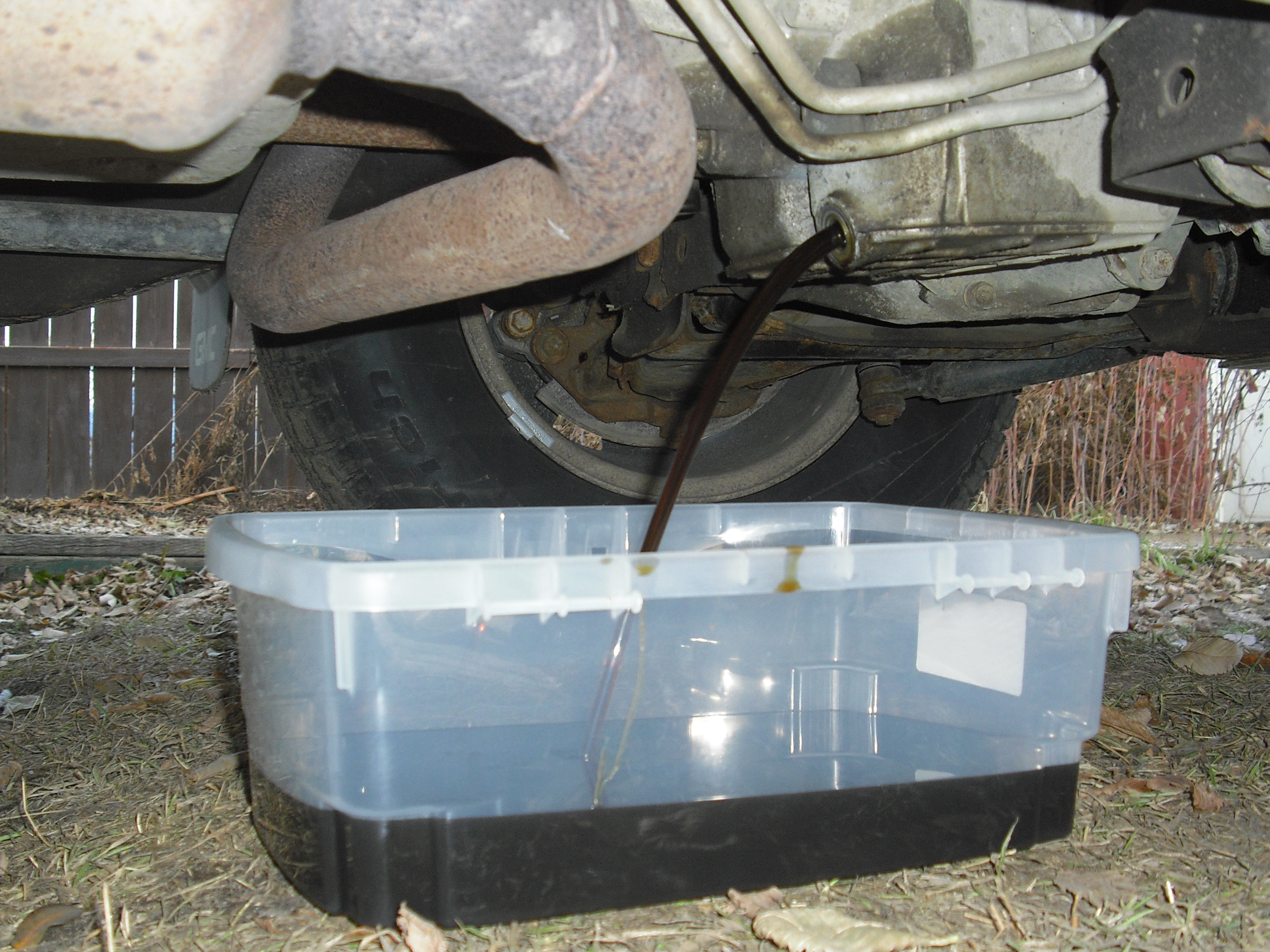
Waste oil in the form of motor oil

Waste oil is oil containing not only breakdown products but also impurities from use. Some examples of waste oil are used oils such as hydraulic oil, transmission oil, brake fluids, motor oil, crankcase oil, gear box oil and synthetic oil. Many of the same problems associated with natural petroleum exist with waste oil. When waste oil from vehicles drips out engines over streets and roads, the oil travels into the water table bringing with it such toxins as benzene. This poisons both soil and drinking water. Runoff from storms carries waste oil into rivers and oceans, poisoning them as well.

=== Produced water and drilling waste discharges ===
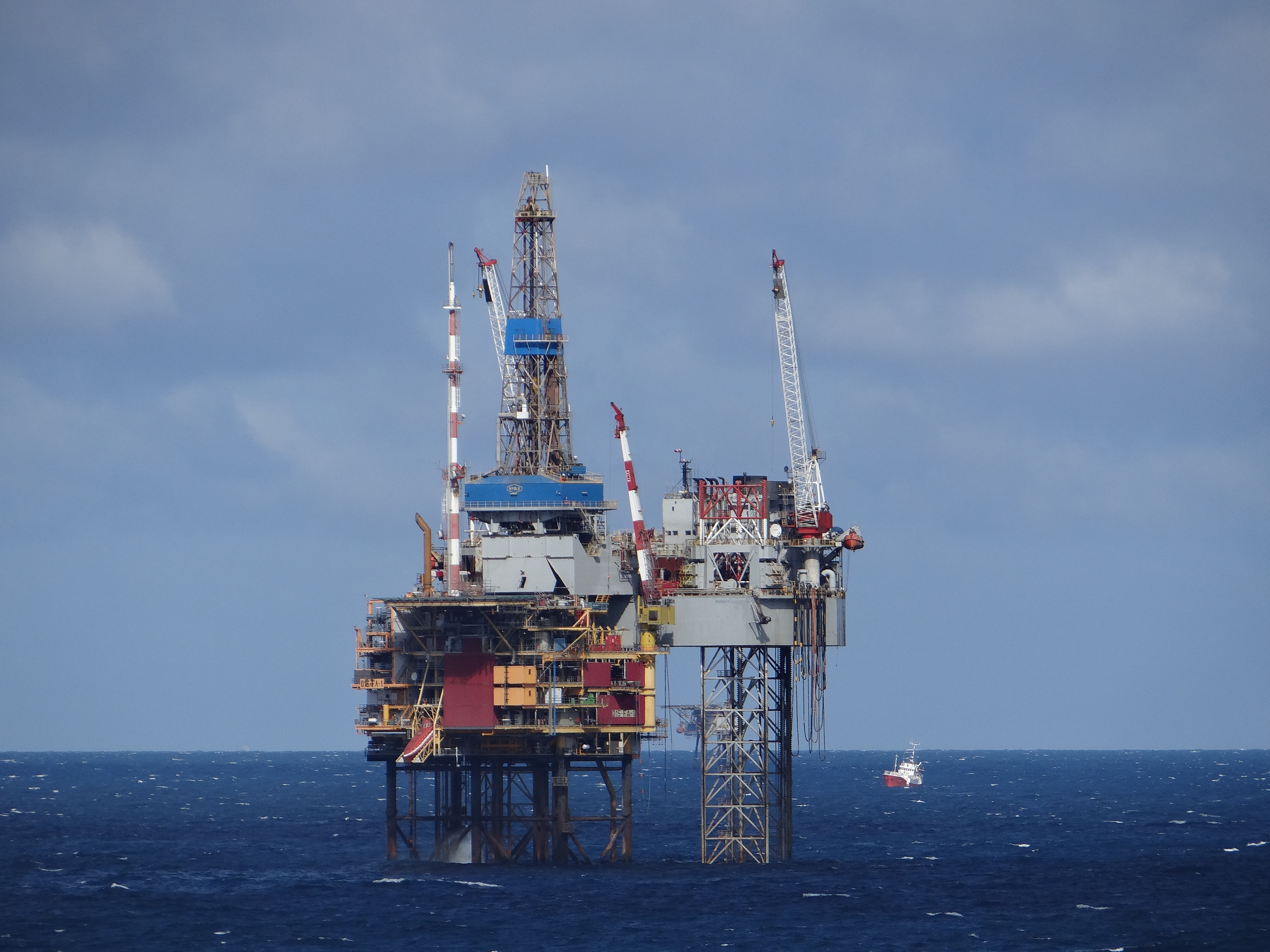
North Sea Oil Rig

Produced water (PW) discharges from petroleum extraction results in PAH (Poly-aromatic Hydrocarbon) emission in the ocean. Approximately 400 million tons of PW discharge is released annually from oil-fields in the North Sea, UK and Norwegian discharges combined. PW discharge is the largest emission event in the marine environment world and it is a result of offshore oil and gas production. The composition of materials in the PW depends on the characteristics of the region. However, PW mainly contains a mixture of a few select products such as formation water, oil, gas, brine water and added chemicals. Just like PW, formation water composition also depends on its surroundings although, it mainly consists of dissolved inorganic and organic compounds. PW was responsible for releasing 129 tons of PAHs in 2017. Due to the presence of harmful chemicals in PW, it is responsible for evoking toxic responses in the surrounding environment. For example, surveys done in the Norwegian Continental Shelf (NCS) found that PAHs released by PW were responsible for biological changes in mussel and Atlantic cod. Formation of PAH burden caused DNA damage and digestive-gland histochemistry in mussel. PAHs also pose a serious threat to human health. Long term exposure to PAHs have been linked to a series of health problems such as lung, skin, bladder, gastrointestinal cancer.

== Global impacts ==
=== Climate change ===
The emissions from the extraction, refinement, transportation, and consumption of petroleum have caused changes in Earth's natural greenhouse gas levels, most significantly human carbon dioxide emissions. Carbon dioxide is a greenhouse gas that attracts heat in order to keep Earth's temperature from below freezing but the excess amount of carbon dioxide in the atmosphere from things like the petroleum industry have caused an imbalance. Swedish Nobel chemist Svante Arrhenius created a mathematical model that showed an increase of carbon dioxide results in an increase in surface temperature. Furthermore, these emissions are at a record high and the IPCC (2007) states that Earth's climate system will heat up by 3 degrees Celsius for a doubling of carbon dioxide. These numbers are troubling as the resulting climate change will cause more intense hurricanes and storms, increased droughts and heat waves, frequent flooding, and more severe wildfires. For low-income communities that have inadequate infrastructure, they are often less likely to recover from infrastructure damage due to climate disasters as quickly.

=== Ocean acidification ===
Following the carbon cycle, carbon dioxide enters our oceans where it reacts with the water molecules and produces a substance called carbonic acid. This increase in carbonic acid had dropped the pH of Earth's oceans, causing increased acidity. Since the Industrial Revolution, the start of the petroleum industry, the pH of the oceans has dropped from 8.21 to 8.10. It may not seem like much but this change shows a 30% increase in acidity which has caused a lot of problems for sea life. As Earth's oceans continue to acidify there are less carbonate ions available for calcifying meaning that organisms have a hard time building and maintaining their shells and skeletons. Based on current levels of carbon dioxide Earth's oceans could have a pH level of 7.8 by the end of the 21st century.

== Subsidies ==
Modern human societies utilize cheap and abundant energy to promote economic growth and maintain political stability. Government's and economic institutions around the world lower prices and increase supplies of fossil fuels for both consumers and producers by providing various forms of financial support to the industry. These include such traditional subsidies as direct payments, tax preferences, depletion allowances, research & development grants, and the removal of existing environmental protections. Considering all forms of support, the largest assistance to fossil fuels arises from the failure of governments to pass along most costs from the environmental and human-health impacts of the waste.

Accounting by the International Energy Agency and OECD indicates that traditional subsidies throughout the world amounted to about $400–600 Billion annually during years 2010–2015, and remained near $400 Billion in year 2018 with 40% going to oil. By comparison, a working group at the International Monetary Fund estimates that all support to the fossil-fuel industry totaled about $5.2 Trillion (6.4% of global gross domestic product) during year 2017. The largest subsidizers were China, the United States, Russia, the European Union, and India which together accounted for about 60% of the total.

According to the theory of ideal market competition, accurate prices could act to drive more responsible industry and consumer choices that reduce waste and long-term scarcity. Eliminating subsidies and implementing carbon fees to realize accurate prices would have their most direct effects from the supply side of the industry. By contrast, the objective of some carbon tax and carbon trading mechanisms is to enforce pricing accuracy from the consumption side.

== Mitigation ==
=== Conservation and phasing out ===
Many countries across the World have subsidies and policies designed to reduce the use of petroleum and fossil fuels. Examples include China which switched from providing subsidies for fossil fuels to providing subsidies for renewable energy. Other examples include Sweden which created laws which are designed to eventually phase out the use of petroleum, which is known as the 15-year plan. These policies have their benefits and their challenges and every country has had their different experiences. In China, positive benefits were observed in the energy system due to higher renewable energy subsidies in three ways. It made consumption of energy cleaner due to moving for cleaner sources. Secondly, it helped increase the efficiency and third it resolved the issue of imbalanced distribution and consumption. However, from the Chinese experience, there were challenges observed. These challenges included economic challenges like initially lower economic benefits for subsidies from renewable energy than for oil. Other challenges included a high cost of research and development, the uncertainty of cost and potentially high-risk investments. These factors make the development of renewable energy very dependent on government support. However, aims of phasing out fossil fuels and petroleum use may also present economic benefits such as increased investment. This strategy may help achieve social goals for example reduction in pollution which might translate to better environmental and health outcomes.

Another option for conserving energy and phasing out petroleum use is adopting new technologies in order to increase efficiency. This can include changing production methods and modes of transportation.

=== Substitution of other energy sources ===
Alternatives to petroleum can include using other "cleaner" energy sources such as renewable energy, nuclear power, natural gas or biodiesel. Some of the alternatives have their strengths and limitations that might impact on the possibility of adopting them in the future.

Using corn-based ethanol might be an alternative to using petroleum. However, studies that concluded that corn-based ethanol uses less net energy do not factor in the co-products of production. Current corn-ethanol technologies are much less petroleum intensive than gasoline however have the GHG emission levels similar to gasoline. The literature is mainly unclear what the GHG emission changes would be by adopting corn-based ethanol for biodiesel. Some studies report a 20% increase in GHG emissions and some report a 32% decrease. However, the actual number might be a 13% decrease in GHG emissions which is not a significant decrease. The future of biodiesel might be adopting cellulose ethanol technology to produce biodiesel as that technology will contribute to a decrease in emissions.

Renewable energy alternatives also exist. These include solar energy, wind energy, geothermal and hydroelectricity as well as other sources. These sources are said to have much lower emissions, and almost minimal secondary by products. The production of renewable energy is projected to grow in nearly every region in the World. Natural gas is also seen as a potential alternative to oil. Natural gas is much cleaner than oil in terms of emissions. However natural gas has its limitation in terms of mass production. For example, in order to switch from crude oil to natural gas there are technical and network changes that need to occur before the implementation can be complete. Two possible strategies are to first develop the end use technology first or second is to completely change the fuel infrastructure.

=== Use of biomass instead of petroleum ===
Biomass is becoming a potential option as a substitute for petroleum. This is due to the increased environmental impacts of petroleum and the desire to reduce the use of petroleum. Potential substitutes include cellulose from fibrous plant materials as a substitute for oil-based products. Plastics can be created by cellulose instead of oil and plant fat can be substituted for oil to fuel cars. In order for biomass to succeed there needs to be an integration of different technologies to different biomass feedstock in to produce different bioproducts. Incentives for biomass are a decrease of carbon dioxide, need for a new energy supply and need to revitalize rural areas.

=== Safety measures ===
There is also the potential to implement many technologies as safety measures to mitigate safety and health risks of the petroleum industry. These include measures to reduce oil spills, false floors to prevent gasoline drips in the water table and double-hulled tanker ships. A relatively new technology that can mitigate air pollution is called bio-filtration. Bio filtration is where off-gasses that have biodegradable VOCs or inorganic air toxins are vented out through a biologically active material. This technology successfully used in Germany and the Netherlands mainly for odor control. There are lower costs and environmental benefits include low energy requirements

== See also ==
- Arctic Refuge drilling controversy
- Environmental impact of the oil shale industry
- Environmental impact of the petroleum industry in Nigeria
- Environmental impact of fracking
- Environmental impact of the energy industry
- Environmental issues of oil sands
- Linear infrastructure intrusions
- List of environmental issues
- Peak oil
