= First Oil Well =

First Oil Well may refer to:

- Bibiheybət (Bibi-Heybat), near Baku, Azerbaijan, is the site of the first ever mechanically drilled oil well (1846) Petroleum industry in Azerbaijan
- Village Bóbrka, near Krosno, Poland, is the site of one of the first oil wells (1854). Polish inventor Jan Józef Ignacy Łukasiewicz designed the machines.
- Oil Springs, Ontario, the world's first commercial oil well (1858).
- Drake Well Museum, site of the American first successful oil well in Titusville, Pennsylvania (1859).
- Masjed Soleyman oil field, the first oil well in the Middle East and IRAN. (1908)
- First Oil Well, Bahrain, the first oil well in the Persian Gulf (1932).
- Mosoare, near Târgu Ocna, Romania, the site of the first mechanically drilled oil well in Romania (1861 or 1963).
- Dammam No. 7, the first commercial oil well in Saudi Arabia (1938).
