= Gas flare =

Safety device for burning off flammable gas

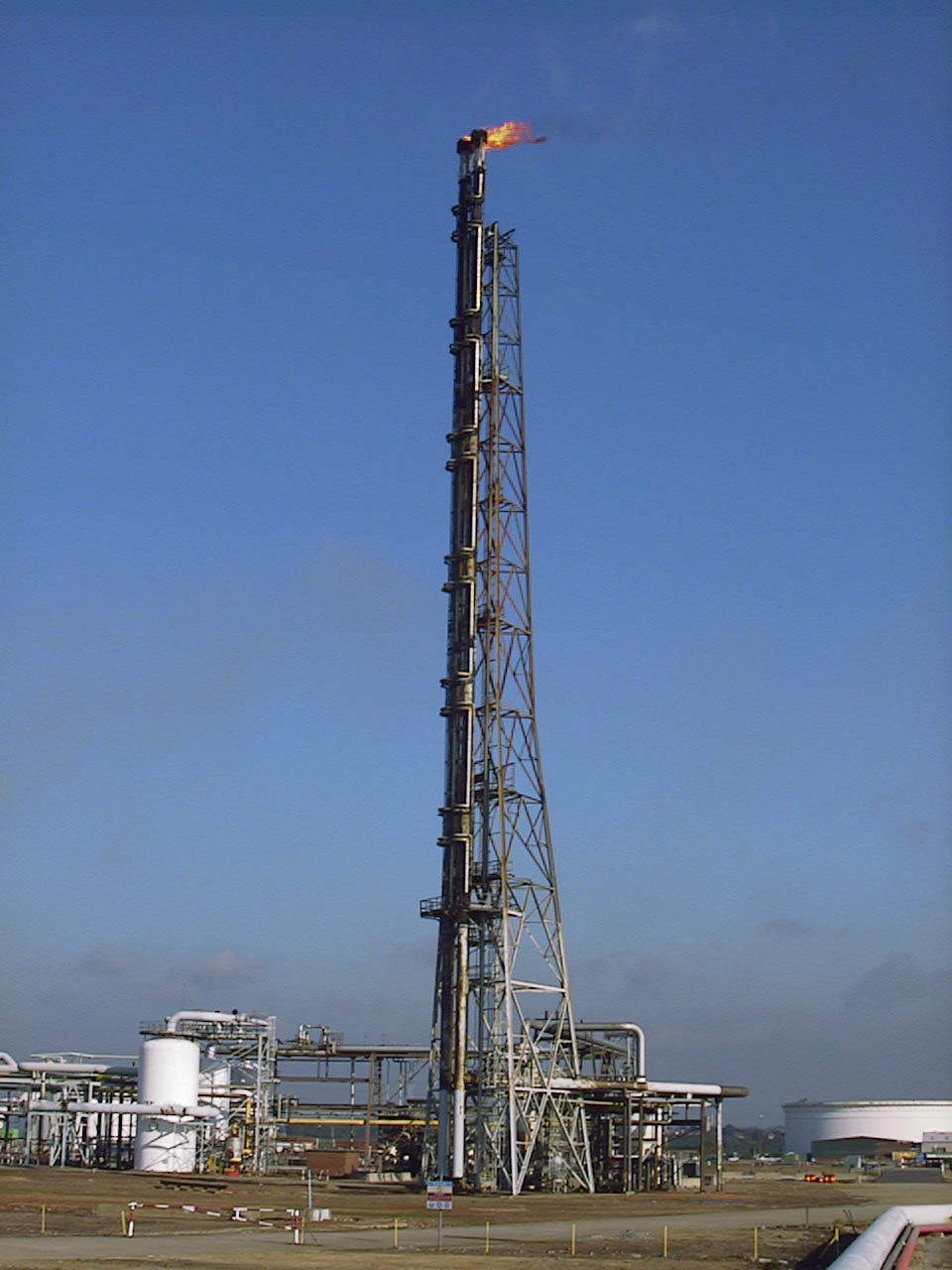
Flare stack at the Shell Haven refinery in England

A gas flare, alternatively known as a flare stack, flare boom, ground flare, or flare pit, is a gas combustion device or chimney type used in places such as petroleum refineries, chemical plants and natural gas processing plants, oil or gas extraction sites having oil wells, gas wells, offshore oil and gas rigs and landfills.

In industrial plants, flare stacks are primarily used for burning off flammable gas released by safety valves during unplanned overpressuring of plant equipment. During plant or partial plant startups and shutdowns, they are also often used for the planned combustion of gases over relatively short periods.

At oil and gas extraction sites, gas flares are similarly used for a variety of startup, maintenance, testing, safety, and emergency purposes. In a practice known as production flaring, they may also be used to dispose of large amounts of unwanted associated petroleum gas, possibly throughout the life of an oil well.

Approximately 167 billion cubic meters of gas is wasted each year as a result of gas flaring, according to the World Bank.

== Overall flare system in industrial plants ==
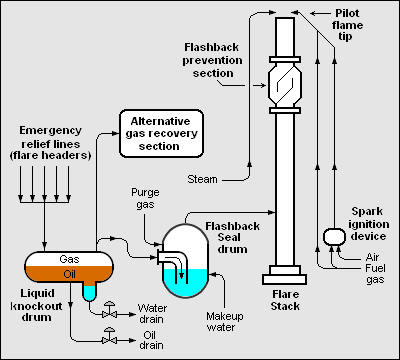
Schematic flow diagram of an overall vertical, elevated flare stack system in an industrial plant.

When industrial plant equipment items are overpressured, the pressure relief valve is an essential safety device that automatically releases gases and sometimes liquids. Those pressure relief valves are required by industrial design codes and standards as well as by law.

The released gases and liquids are routed through large piping systems called flare headers to a vertical elevated flare. The released gases are burned as they exit the flare stacks. The size and brightness of the resulting flame depends upon the flammable material's flow rate in joules per hour (or btu per hour).

Most industrial plant flares have a vapor–liquid separator (also known as a knockout drum) upstream of the flare to remove any large amounts of liquid that may accompany the relieved gases.

Steam is very often injected into the flame to reduce the formation of black smoke. When too much steam is added, a condition known as "oversteaming" can occur resulting in reduced combustion efficiency and higher emissions. To keep the flare system functional, a small amount of gas is continuously burned, like a pilot light, so that the system is always ready for its primary purpose as an overpressure safety system.

The adjacent flow diagram depicts the typical components of an overall industrial flare stack system:

- A knockout drum to remove any oil or water from the relieved gases. There may be several knock out drums: high-pressure and low-pressure drums taking relief flow from high-pressure and low-pressure equipment. A cold relief drum which is segregated from wet relief system because of the risk of freezing.
- A water seal drum to prevent any flashback of the flame from the top of the flare stack.
- An alternative gas recovery system for use during partial plant startups and shutdowns as well as other times when required. The recovered gas is routed into the fuel gas system of the overall industrial plant.
- A steam injection system to provide an external momentum force used for efficient mixing of air with the relieved gas, which promotes smokeless burning.
- A pilot flame (with its ignition system) that burns all the time so that it is available to ignite relieved gases when needed.
- The flare stack, including a flashback prevention section at the upper part of the stack.

The schematic shows a pipe flare tip. The flare tip can have several configurations:

- a simple pipe flare
- a sonic tip – upstream pressure > 5 bar
- a multi nozzle tip, sonic or subsonic
- a Coandă tip – a profiled tip using the Coandă effect to entrain air into the gas to improve combustion.

=== Flare stack height ===
The height of a flare stack, or the reach of a flare boom, is determined by the thermal radiation that is permissible or tolerable for equipment or personnel to be exposed to. For continuous exposure of personnel wearing appropriate industrial clothing a maximum radiation level of 1.58 kW/m^{2} (500 Btu/hr.ft²) is recommended. Higher radiation levels are permissible but for reduced exposure times:

- 4.73 kW/m^{2} (1500 Btu/hr.ft²) would limit exposure to 3 to 4 minutes
- 6.31 kW/m^{2} (2000 Btu/hr.ft²) would limit exposure to 30 seconds.

== Ground flares ==
Ground flares are designed to hide the flame from sight and to reduce thermal radiation and noise. They comprise a steel box or cylinder lined with refractory material. They are open at the top and have openings around the base to allow combustion air to enter. They may have an array of multiple flare tips to provide turndown capability and to spread the flame across the cross-section of the flare. They are generally used onshore in environmentally sensitive areas and have been used offshore on floating production storage and offloading installations (FPSOs).

== Crude oil production flares ==
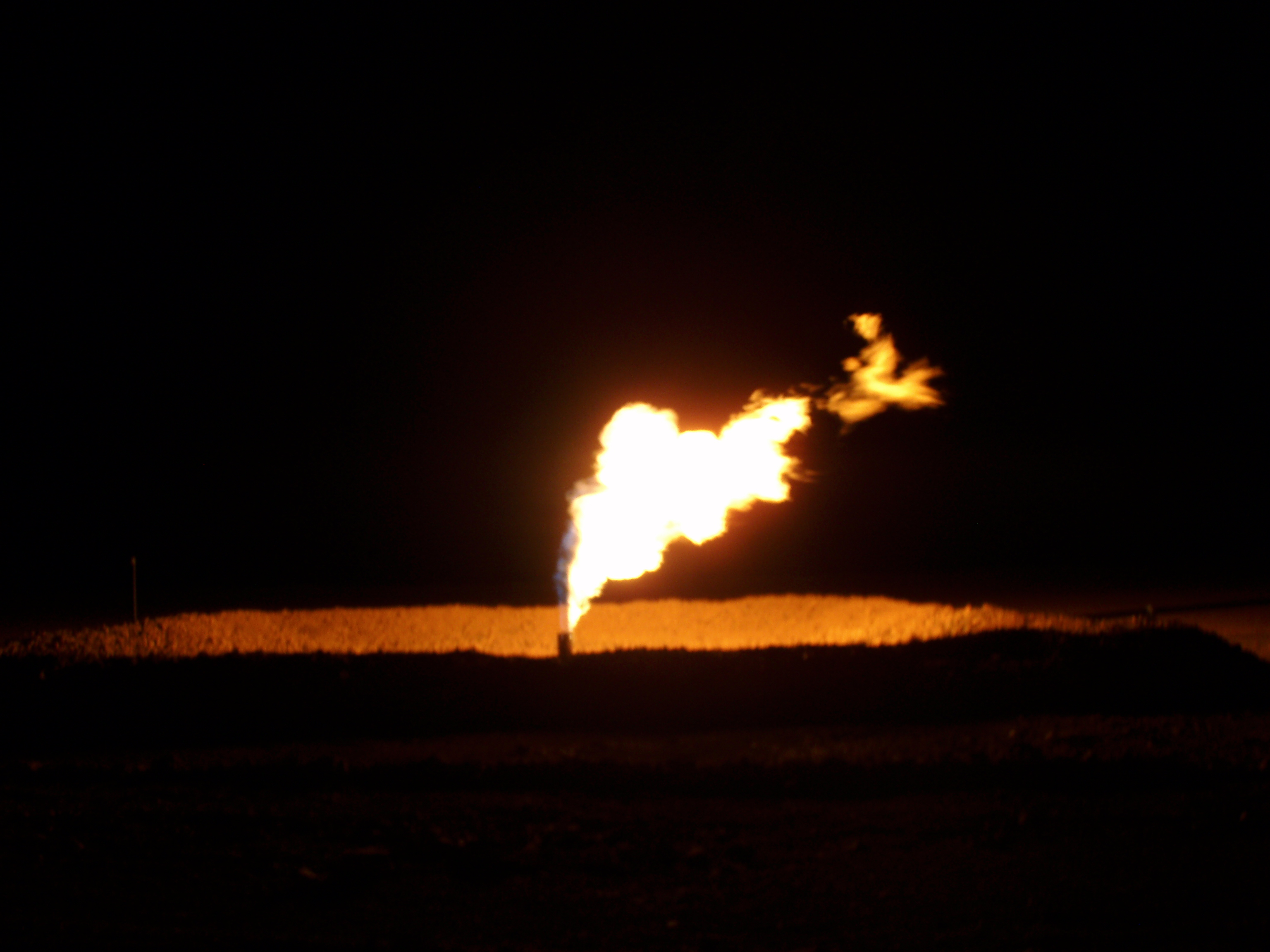
Ground-level flaring of gas in North Dakota

When crude oil is extracted and produced from oil wells, raw natural gas associated with the oil is brought to the surface as well. Especially in areas of the world lacking pipelines and other gas transportation infrastructure, vast amounts of such associated gas are commonly flared as waste or unusable gas. The flaring of associated gas may occur at the top of a vertical flare stack, or it may occur in a ground-level flare in an earthen pit. Preferably, associated gas is reinjected into the reservoir, which saves it for future use while maintaining higher well pressure and crude oil producibility.

Advances in satellite monitoring, along with voluntary reporting, have revealed that about 150 × 10^{9} cubic meters (5.3 × 10^{12} cubic feet) of associated gas have been flared globally each year since at least the mid-1990s until 2020. In 2011, that was equivalent to about 25 percent of the annual natural gas consumption in the United States or about 30 per cent of the annual gas consumption in the European Union. At market, this quantity of gas—at a nominal value of $5.62 per 1000 cubic feet—would be worth US$29.8 billion. Additionally, the waste is a significant source of carbon dioxide (CO_{2}) and other greenhouse gas emissions.

== Biogas flares ==
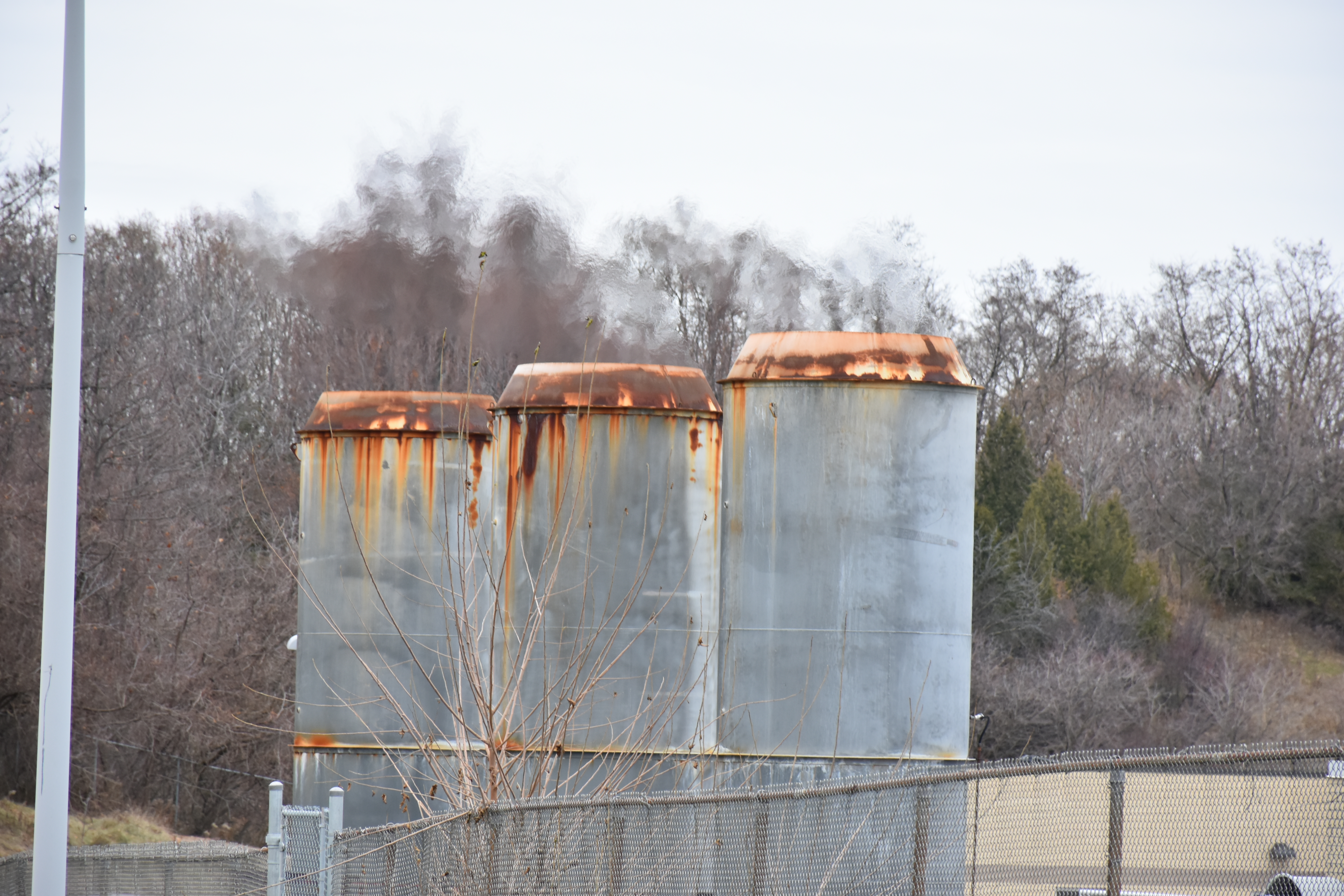
Flare stack igniting biogas from sewage sludge digesters at a sewage treatment plant in Ontario, Canada.

An important source of anthropogenic methane comes from the treatment and storage of organic waste material including waste water, animal waste and landfill. Gas flares are used in any process that results in the generation and collection of biogas. As a result, gas flares are a standard component of an installation for controlling the production of biogas. They are installed on landfill sites, waste water treatment plant and anaerobic digestion plants that use agriculturally or domestically produced organic waste to produce methane for use as a fuel or for heating.

Gas flares on biogas collection systems are used if the gas production rates are not sufficient to warrant use in any industrial process. However, on a plant where the gas production rate is sufficient for direct use in an industrial process that could be classified as part of the circular economy, and that may include the generation of electricity, the production of natural gas quality biogas for vehicle fuel or for heating in buildings, drying refuse-derived fuel or leachate treatment, gas flares are used as a back-up system during down-time for maintenance or breakdown of generation equipment. In this latter case, generation of biogas cannot normally be interrupted, and a gas flare is employed to maintain the internal pressure on the biological process.

There are two types of gas flare used for controlling biogas, open or enclosed. Open flares burn at a lower temperature, less than 1000 °C and are generally cheaper than enclosed flares that burn at a higher combustion temperature and are usually supplied to conform to a specific residence time of 0.3s within the chimney to ensure complete destruction of any toxic molecules contained within the biogas. Flare specification usually demands that enclosed flares must operate at >1000 °C and <1200 °C; this in order to ensure a 98% destruction efficiency and avoid the formation of NOx.

== Environmental impacts ==
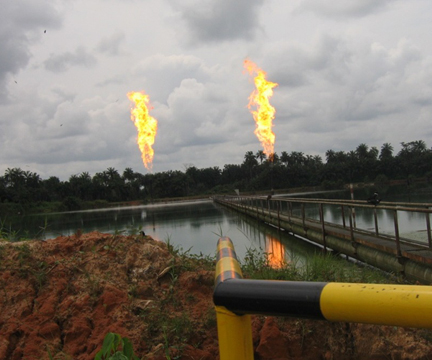
Flaring of associated gas from a site in Nigeria.

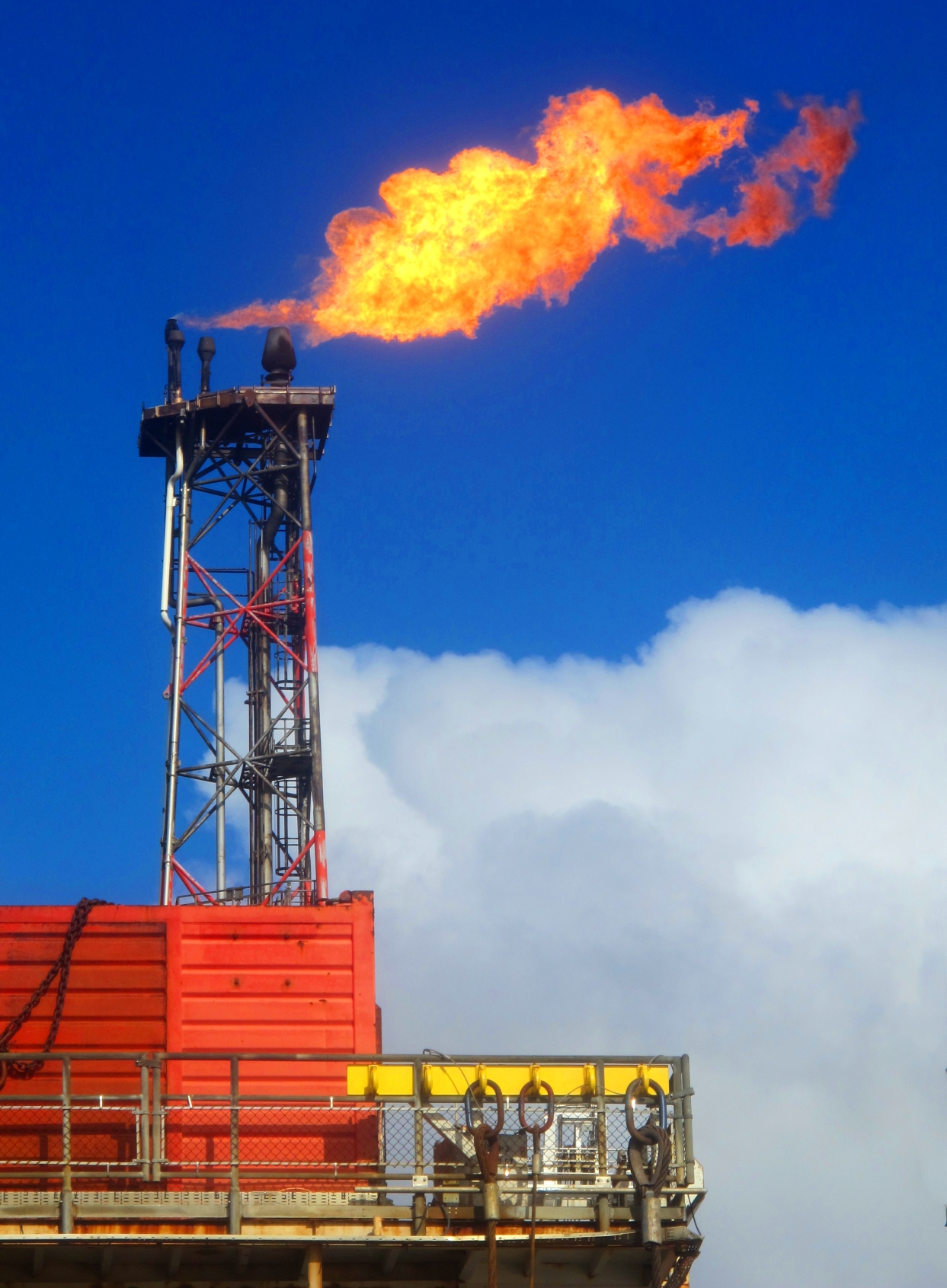
Flaring gases from an oil platform in the North Sea.

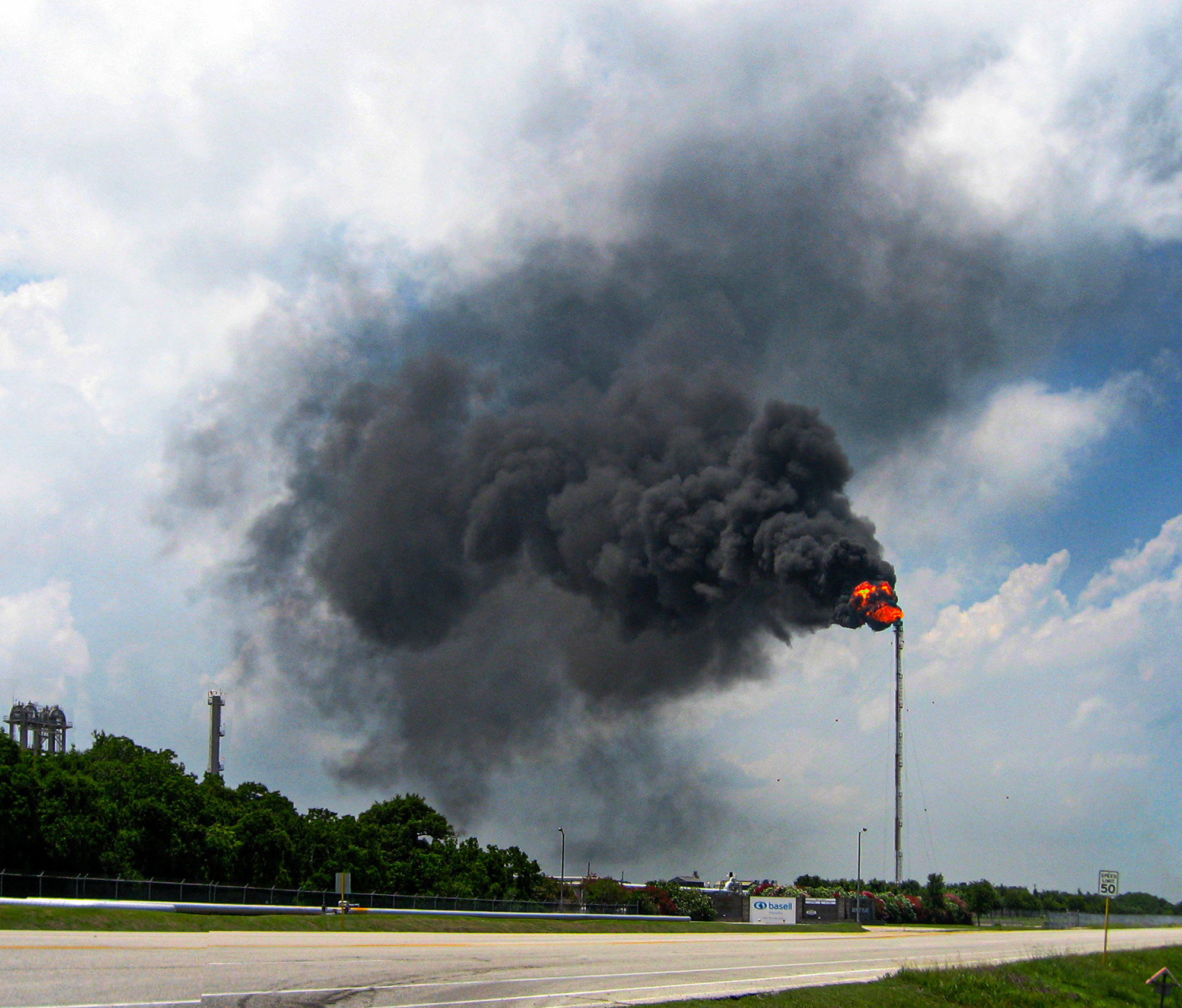
Flare, Bayport Industrial District, Harris County, Texas

The natural gas that is not combusted by a flare is vented into the atmosphere as methane. Methane's estimated global warming potential is 28-36 times greater than that of CO_{2} over the course of a century, and 84-87 times greater over two decades. Natural gas flaring produces CO_{2} and many other compounds, depending on the chemical composition of the natural gas and on how well the natural gas burns in the flare. Therefore, to the extent that gas flares convert methane to CO_{2} before it is released into the atmosphere, they reduce the amount of global warming that would otherwise occur.

Flaring emissions contributed to 270 Mt (megatonnes) of CO_{2} in 2017 and reducing flaring emissions is thought to be an important component in curbing global warming. An increasing number of governments and industries have pledged to eliminate or reduce flaring. The Global Methane Pledge signed at COP26, in which 111 nations committed to reducing methane emissions by at least 30 percent from 2020 levels by 2030, is also playing a role in raising the global focus on methane.

Additional noxious fumes emitted by flaring may include, aromatic hydrocarbons (benzene, toluene, xylenes) and benzo(a)pyrene, which are known to be carcinogenic. A 2013 study found that gas flares contributed over 40% of the black carbon deposited in the Arctic.

Flaring can affect wildlife by attracting birds and insects to the flame. Approximately 7,500 migrating songbirds were attracted to and killed by the flare at the liquefied natural gas terminal in Saint John, New Brunswick, Canada on September 13, 2013. Similar incidents have occurred at flares on offshore oil and gas installations. Moths are known to be attracted to lights. A brochure published by the Secretariat of the Convention on Biological Diversity describing the Global Taxonomy Initiative describes a situation where "a taxonomist working in a tropical forest noticed that a gas flare at an oil refinery was attracting and killing hundreds of these [hawk or sphinx] moths. Over the course of the months and years that the refinery was running a vast number of moths must have been killed, suggesting that plants could not be pollinated over a large area of forest".

=== Adverse health effects ===
Flares release several different chemicals including: benzene, particulates, nitrogen oxides, heavy metals, black carbon, and carbon monoxide. Several of these pollutants correlate with preterm birth and reduced newborn birth weight. According to one study from 2020, pregnant women living near flaring natural gas and oil wells have reportedly experienced a 50% greater premature birth rate. Flares may emit methane and other volatile organic compounds as well as sulfur dioxide and other sulfur compounds, which are known to exacerbate asthma and other respiratory disease.

A 2021 study found that a 1% increase in flared natural gas increases the respiratory-related hospitalization rate by 0.73%.

== See also ==
- Blowdown stack
- Flue-gas stack
- Gas venting

== Media ==
External images
- World Bank video about reducing flaring
