= Associated petroleum gas =

Form of natural gas

Associated petroleum gas (APG), or associated gas, is a form of natural gas which is found with deposits of petroleum, either dissolved in the oil or as a free "gas cap" above the oil in the reservoir. The gas can be utilized in a number of ways after processing: sold and included in the natural-gas distribution networks, used for on-site electricity generation with engines or turbines, reinjected for secondary recovery and used in enhanced oil recovery, converted from gas to liquids producing synthetic fuels, or used as feedstock for the petrochemical industry, but much of it worldwide is flared.

== Composition ==
APG is primarily a mixture of hydrocarbon molecules that are classified as alkanes. The following table lists typical percentages of the major alkanes in APG, and includes the typical levels of nitrogen and carbon dioxide. Water (wet gas) and hydrogen sulfide (sour gas) contaminate APG at more varied levels. Helium is present in significant amounts in some cases, and is a relatively valuable by-product. APG is processed to separate out most other components before the methane-rich gas is sold into natural-gas distribution networks.

| Component | Chemical formula | Volume fraction (%) | Weight fraction (%) |
|---|---|---|---|
| Methane | CH_{4} | 81 | 60 |
| Ethane | C_{2}H_{6} | 5.5 | 7.7 |
| Propane | C_{3}H_{8} | 6.6 | 13.5 |
| Butane | C_{4}H_{10} | 4.0 | 10.8 |
| Pentane | C_{5}H_{12} | 1.4 | 4.8 |
| Nitrogen | N_{2} | 1.0 | 1.3 |
| Carbon dioxide | CO_{2} | 0.17 | 0.33 |

== Uses ==
Like crude oil, APG is both a primary energy resource and a primary commodity that enables much of the modern world economy. Statistics from the International Energy Agency show that the natural-gas supplies steadily increased during 1990–2017 to meet the demands of expanding global population and consumerism. APG is nevertheless a finite fossil fuel, and the crossing of planetary boundaries could impose earlier limits on its value and usefulness.

Following extraction, petroleum companies prefer to transport both crude oil and APG to their respective refiners for processing and distribution to consumers. Most modern wells are planned to include gas pipeline transport, but some oil wells are drilled only to get the more lucrative oil, in which case the options are to locally use, process, or dispose of the APG. A traditional local use is to re-inject the gas for storage, and to re-pressurize the well to extend the oil production lifetime. On-site processing with various mobile systems also exist for producing natural gas liquids (NGL), compressed natural gas (CNG), liquified natural gas (LNG), and gas to liquids (GTL) fuels that can be transported by truck or ship. Electricity generation from on-site microturbines and engines is also compatible with minimally processed APG.

== Flaring ==
Historically APG was, and still may be, a waste product from the petroleum extraction industry. It may be a stranded gas reserve due to the remote location of the oil field, either at sea or on land. The gas is then simply vented or, preferably, burnt off in gas flares. When this occurs it is referred to as flare gas.

APG flaring is controversial since it is a pollutant, a source of global warming and a waste of a finite fuel source. APG is flared in many countries where there are significant power shortages. In the United Kingdom, gas may not be flared without written consent from the UK government to prevent unnecessary waste and protect the environment. Russia is the world leader and contributed 30 percent of total global APG flared in 2009.

The World Bank estimates that over 150 billion cubic metres of natural gas are flared or vented annually. Flared natural gas is worth approximately 30.6 billion dollars and equivalent to 25 percent of the United States' yearly gas consumption or 30 percent of the European Union's annual gas consumption.

== See also ==
- Coalbed methane — Methane associated with coal deposits
- Landfill gas — Methane associated with municipal landfills
