= Arctic methane emissions =

Release of methane in the Arctic

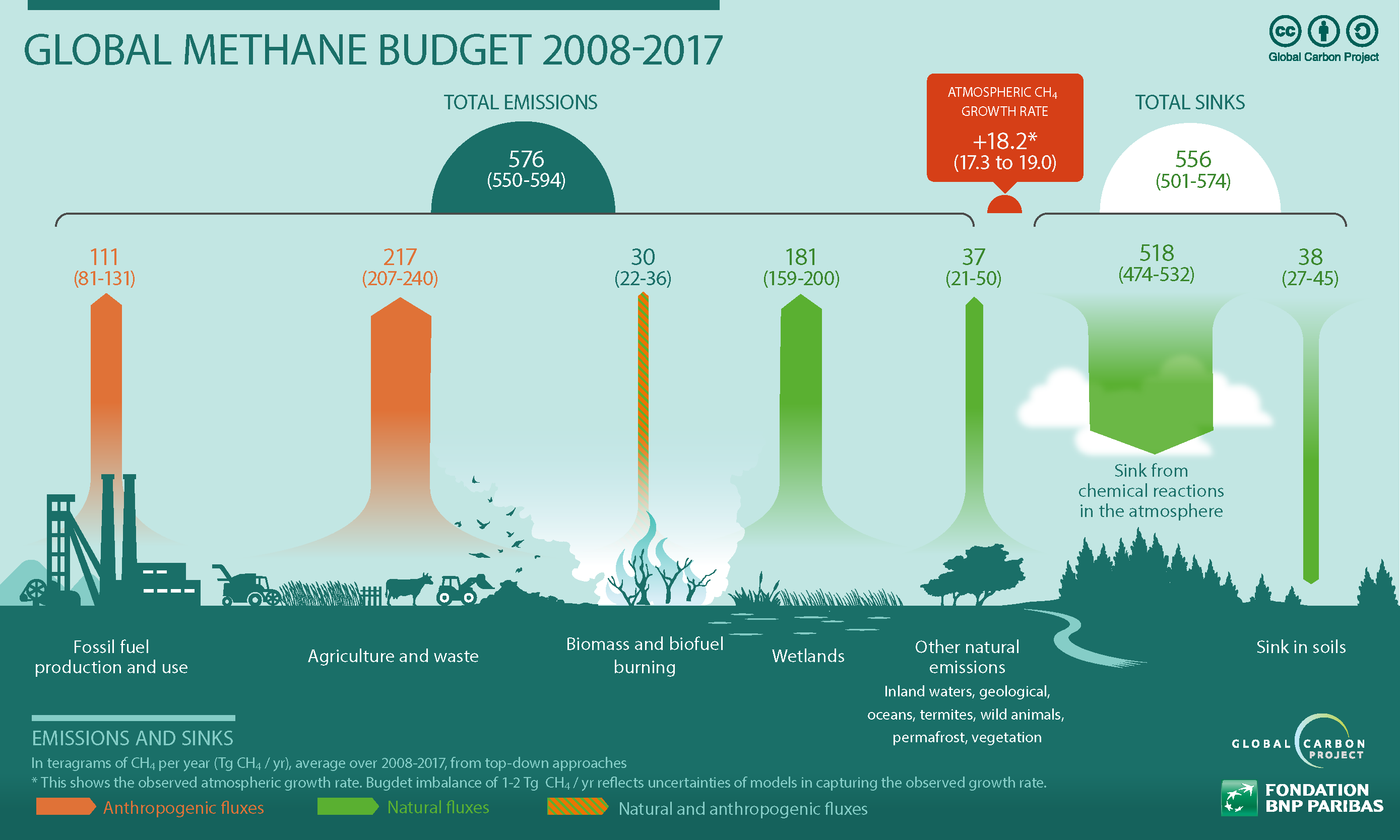
Main sources of global methane emissions (2008–2017): Contributions from the Arctic are part of the fifth column called other natural emissions.

Arctic methane emissions contribute to a rise in methane concentrations in the atmosphere. Whilst the Arctic region is one of many natural sources of the greenhouse gas methane, there is nowadays also a human component to this due to the effects of climate change. In the Arctic, the main human-influenced sources of methane are thawing permafrost, Arctic sea ice melting, clathrate breakdown and Greenland ice sheet melting. This methane release results in a positive climate change feedback (that is, one that amplifies warming), as methane is a powerful greenhouse gas. When permafrost thaws due to global warming, large amounts of organic material can become available for methanogenesis and may therefore be released as methane.

Since around 2018, there have been consistent increases in global levels of methane in the atmosphere, with the 2020 increase of 15.06 parts per billion breaking the previous record increase of 14.05 ppb set in 1991, and 2021 setting an even larger increase of 18.34 ppb. However, there is currently no evidence connecting the Arctic to this recent acceleration. In fact, a 2021 study indicated that the methane contributions from the Arctic were generally overestimated, while the contributions of tropical regions were underestimated.

Nevertheless, the Arctic's role in global methane trends is considered very likely to increase in the future. There is evidence for increasing methane emissions since 2004 from a Siberian permafrost site into the atmosphere linked to warming.

Mitigation of CO_{2} emissions by 2050 (i.e. reaching net zero emissions) is probably not enough to stop the future disappearance of summer Arctic Ocean ice cover. Mitigation of methane emissions is also necessary and this has to be carried out over an even shorter period of time. Such mitigation activities need to be carried out in three main sectors: oil and gas, waste and agriculture. Using available measures this could amount to global reductions of ca.180 Mt/yr or about 45% of the current (2021) emissions by 2030.

== Observed values and processes ==
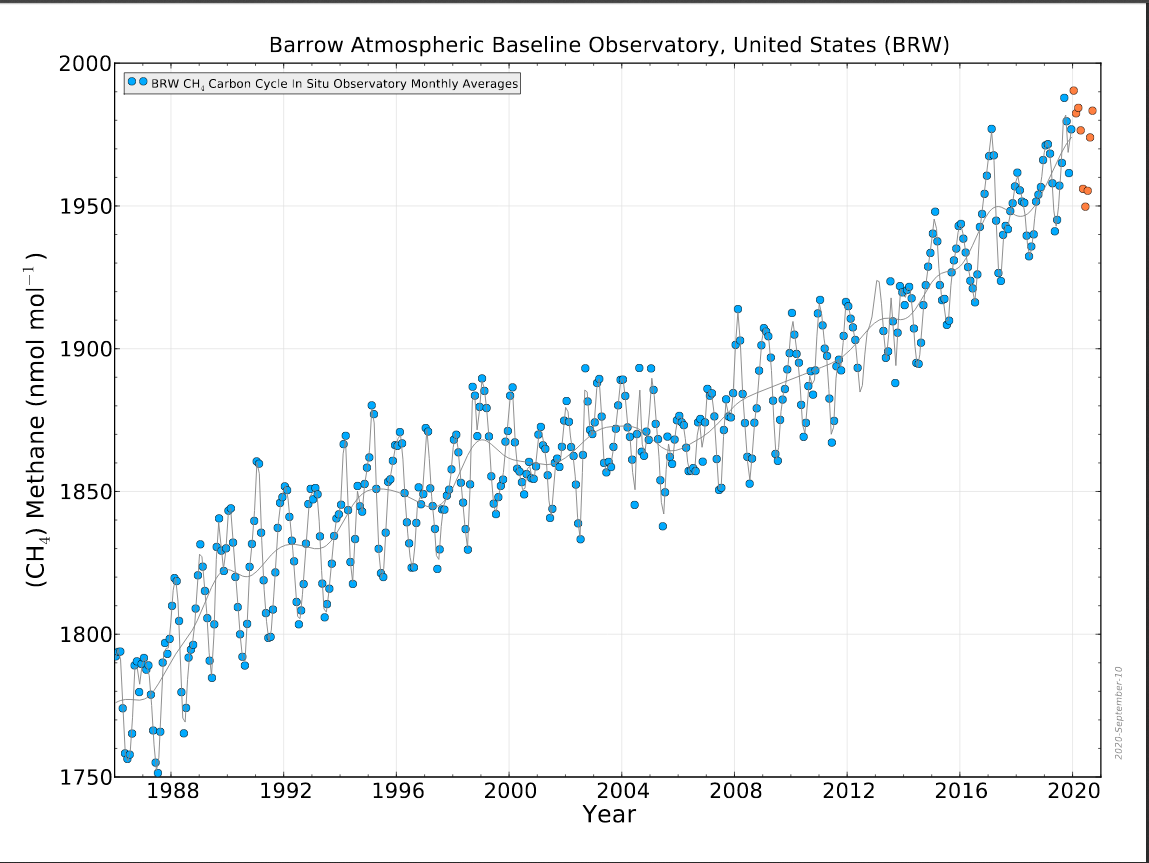
Methane concentrations in Utqiaġvik, Alaska (formerly known as Barrow). A peak methane concentration of 1988 parts per billion was reached in October 2019.

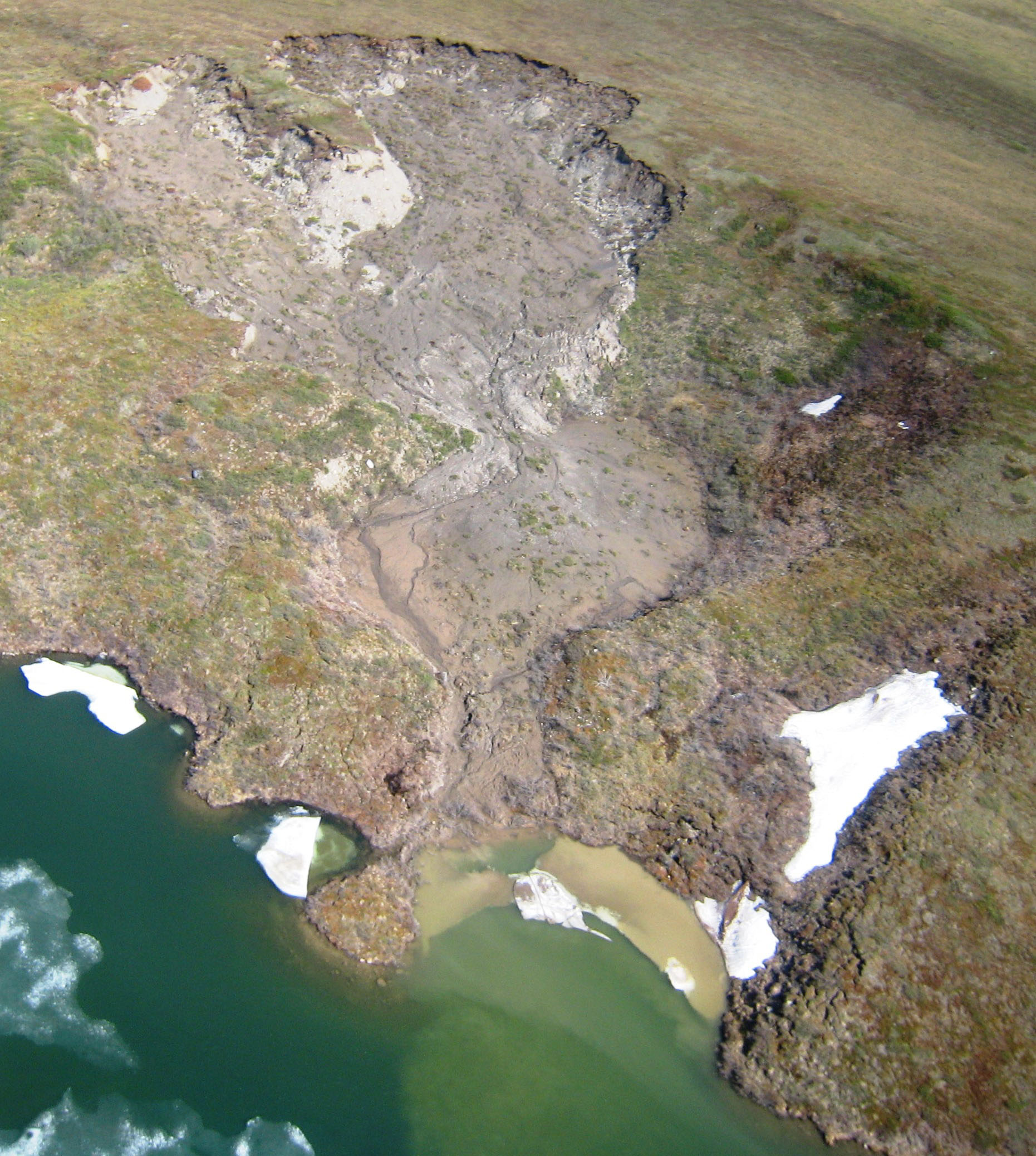
Image showing thawed permafrost resulting in thermokarst, a source of methane released from permafrost

NOAA annual records for methane concentrations in the atmosphere have been updated since 1984. They show substantial growth during the 1980s, a slowdown in annual growth during the 1990s, a plateau (including some years of declining atmospheric concentrations) in the early 2000s and another consistent increase beginning in 2007. Since around 2018, there has been consistent annual increases in global levels of methane, with the 2020 increase of 15.06 parts per billion breaking the previous record increase of 14.05 ppb set in 1991, and 2021 setting an even larger increase of 18.34 ppb.

Due to the relatively short lifetime of atmospheric methane (7–12 years compared to 100s of years for CO_{2}) its global trends are more complex than those of carbon dioxide.

These trends alarm climate scientists, with some suggesting that they represent a climate change feedback increasing natural methane emissions well beyond their preindustrial levels. However, there is currently no evidence connecting the Arctic to this recent acceleration. In fact, a 2021 study indicated that the role of the Arctic was typically overestimated in global methane accounting, while the role of tropical regions was consistently underestimated. The study suggested that tropical wetland methane emissions were the culprit behind the recent growth trend, and this hypothesis was reinforced by a 2022 paper connecting tropical terrestrial emissions to 80% of the global atmospheric methane trends between 2010 and 2019.

Nevertheless, the Arctic's role in global methane trends is considered very likely to increase in the future. There is evidence for increasing methane emissions since 2004 from a Siberian permafrost site into the atmosphere linked to warming.

Radiocarbon dating of trace methane in lake bubbles and soil organic carbon concluded that 0.2 to 2.5 Pg of permafrost carbon has been released as methane and carbon dioxide over the last 60 years. The 2020 heat wave may have released significant methane from carbonate deposits in Siberian permafrost.

Methane emissions by the permafrost carbon feedback—amplification of surface warming due to enhanced radiative forcing by carbon release from permafrost—could contribute an estimated 205 Gt of carbon emissions, leading up to 0.5 °C (0.9 °F) of additional warming by the end of the 21st century. However, recent research based on the carbon isotopic composition of atmospheric methane trapped in bubbles in Antarctic ice suggests that methane emissions from permafrost and methane hydrates were minor during the last deglaciation, suggesting that future permafrost methane emissions may be lower than previously estimated.

=== Comparison of Arctic and Antarctic atmosphere measurements ===
Atmospheric methane concentrations are 8–10% higher in the Arctic than in the Antarctic atmosphere. During cold glacier epochs, this gradient decreases to insignificant levels. Land ecosystems are thought to be the main sources of this asymmetry, although it has been suggested in 2007 that "the role of the Arctic Ocean is significantly underestimated." Soil temperature and moisture levels are important variables in soil methane fluxes in tundra environments.

== Sources of methane in the Arctic ==
Large quantities of methane are stored in the Arctic in natural gas deposits, permafrost, and as undersea clathrates. Permafrost and clathrates degrade on warming, thus large releases of methane from these sources may arise as a result of global warming. Other sources of methane include submarine taliks, river transport, ice complex retreat, submarine permafrost and decaying gas hydrate deposits. A 2024 assessment estimated the total methane emissions from Arctic–Boreal landforms to be approximately 48.7 (13.3–86.9) Tg CH_{4}/year, with marine sources contributing around 4.9 (0.4–19.4) Tg CH_{4}/year. Permafrost contains almost twice as much carbon as the atmosphere, with ~20 Gt of permafrost-associated methane trapped in methane clathrates. Permafrost thaw results in the formation of thermokarst lakes in ice-rich yedoma deposits. Methane frozen in permafrost is slowly released as permafrost thaws.

=== Thawing permafrost ===
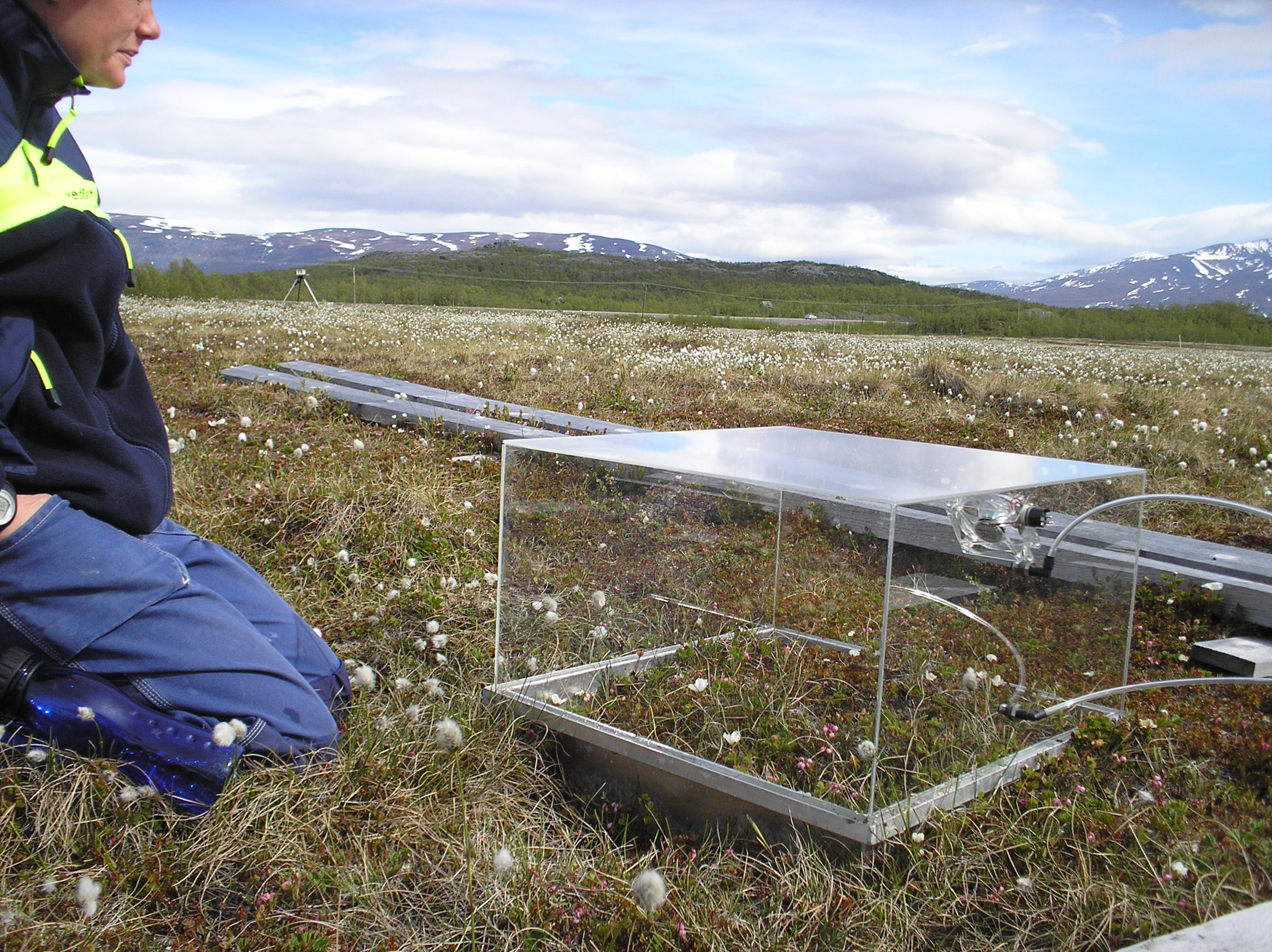
PMMA chambers used to measure methane and CO_{2} emissions in Storflaket peat bog near Abisko, northern Sweden

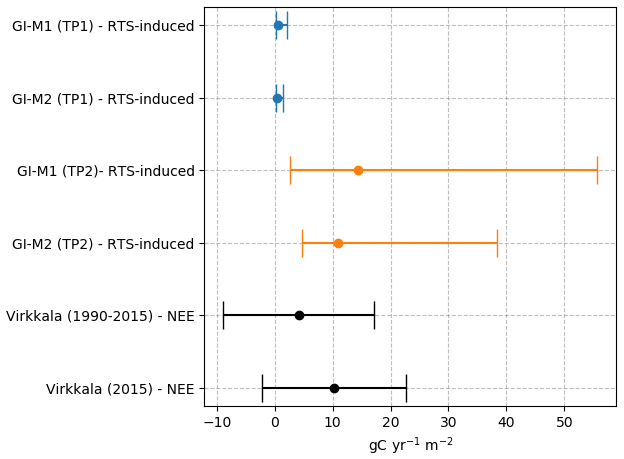
Carbon cycle accelerates in the wake of abrupt thaw (orange) relative to the previous state of the area (blue, black).

Global warming in the Arctic accelerates methane release from both existing stores and methanogenesis in rotting biomass. Methanogenesis requires thoroughly anaerobic environments, which slow down the mobilization of old carbon. A 2015 Nature review estimated that the cumulative emissions from thawed anaerobic permafrost sites were 75–85% lower than the cumulative emissions from aerobic sites, and that even there, methane emissions amounted to only 3 to 7% of CO_{2} emitted in situ (by weight of carbon). While they represented 25 to 45% of the CO_{2}'s potential impact on climate over a 100-year timescale, the review concluded that aerobic permafrost thaw still had a greater warming impact overall. In 2018, however, another study in Nature Climate Change performed seven-year incubation experiments and found that methane production became equivalent to CO_{2} production once a methanogenic microbial community became established at the anaerobic site. This finding had substantially raised the overall warming impact represented by anaerobic thaw sites.

Since methanogenesis requires anaerobic environments, it is frequently associated with Arctic lakes, where the emergence of bubbles of methane can be observed. Lakes produced by the thaw of particularly ice-rich permafrost are known as thermokarst lakes. Not all of the methane produced in the sediment of a lake reaches the atmosphere, as it can get oxidized in the water column or even within the sediment itself. 2022 observations indicate that at least half of the methane produced within thermokarst lakes reaches the atmosphere. Another process which frequently results in substantial methane emissions is the erosion of permafrost-stabilized hillsides and their ultimate collapse. Altogether, these two processes - hillside collapse (also known as retrogressive thaw slump, or RTS) and thermokarst lake formation - are collectively described as abrupt thaw, as they can rapidly expose substantial volumes of soil to microbial respiration in a matter of days, as opposed to the gradual, cm by cm, thaw of formerly frozen soil which dominates across most permafrost environments. This rapidity was illustrated in 2019, when three permafrost sites which would have been safe from thawing under the "intermediate" Representative Concentration Pathway 4.5 for 70 more years had undergone abrupt thaw. Another example occurred in the wake of a 2020 Siberian heatwave, which was found to have increased RTS numbers 17-fold across the northern Taymyr Peninsula – from 82 to 1404, while the resultant soil carbon mobilization increased 28-fold, to an average of 11 grams of carbon per square meter per year across the peninsula (with a range between 5 and 38 grams).

Until recently, Permafrost carbon feedback (PCF) modeling had mainly focused on gradual permafrost thaw, due to the difficulty of modelling abrupt thaw, and because of the flawed assumptions about the rates of methane production. Nevertheless, a study from 2018, by using field observations, radiocarbon dating, and remote sensing to account for thermokarst lakes, determined that abrupt thaw will more than double permafrost carbon emissions by 2100. And a second study from 2020, showed that under the scenario of continually accelerating emissions (RCP 8.5), abrupt thaw carbon emissions across 2.5 million km^{2} are projected to provide the same feedback as gradual thaw of near-surface permafrost across the whole 18 million km^{2} it occupies. Thus, abrupt thaw adds between 60 and 100 gigatonnes of carbon by 2300, increasing carbon emissions by ~125–190% when compared to gradual thaw alone.

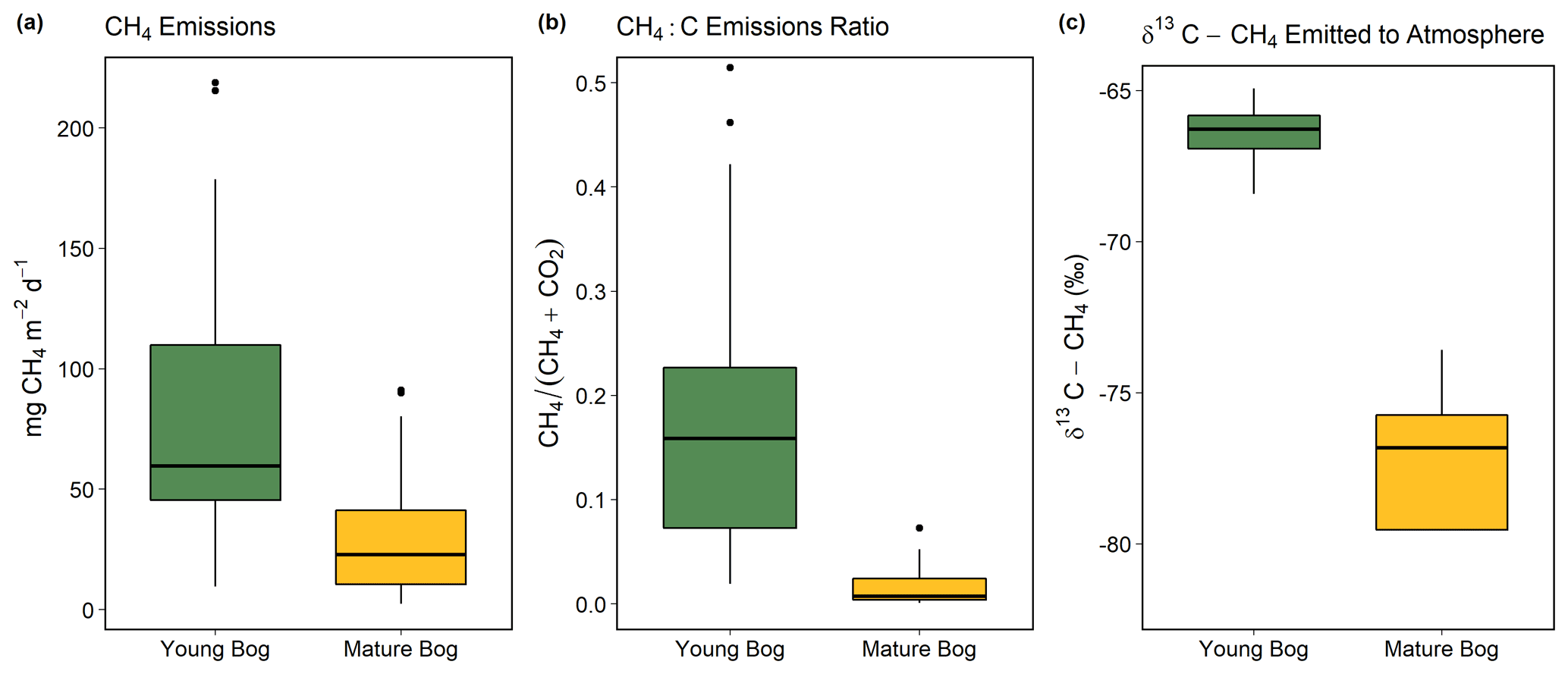
Methane emissions from thawed permafrost appear to decrease as bog matures over time.

However, there is still scientific debate about the rate and the trajectory of methane production in the thawed permafrost environments. For instance, a 2017 paper suggested that even in the thawing peatlands with frequent thermokarst lakes, less than 10% of methane emissions can be attributed to the old, thawed carbon, and the rest is anaerobic decomposition of modern carbon. A follow-up study in 2018 had even suggested that increased uptake of carbon due to rapid peat formation in the thermokarst wetlands would compensate for the increased methane release. Another 2018 paper suggested that permafrost emissions are limited following thermokarst thaw, but are substantially greater in the aftermath of wildfires. In 2022, a paper demonstrated that peatland methane emissions from permafrost thaw are initially quite high (82 milligrams of methane per square meter per day), but decline by nearly three times as the permafrost bog matures, suggesting a reduction in methane emissions in several decades to a century following abrupt thaw.

=== Arctic sea ice melting ===
A 2015 study concluded that Arctic sea ice decline accelerates methane emissions from the Arctic tundra, with the emissions for 2005–2010 being around 1.7 million tonnes higher than they would have been with the sea ice at 1981–1990 levels. One of the researchers noted, "The expectation is that with further sea ice decline, temperatures in the Arctic will continue to rise, and so will methane emissions from northern wetlands."

Cracks in Arctic sea ice expose the seawater to the air, causing mercury in the air to be absorbed into the water. This absorption leads to more mercury, a toxin, entering the food chain where it can negatively affect fish and the animals and people who consume them. Mercury is part of Earth's atmosphere due to natural causes (see mercury cycle) and due to human emissions.

=== Clathrate breakdown ===
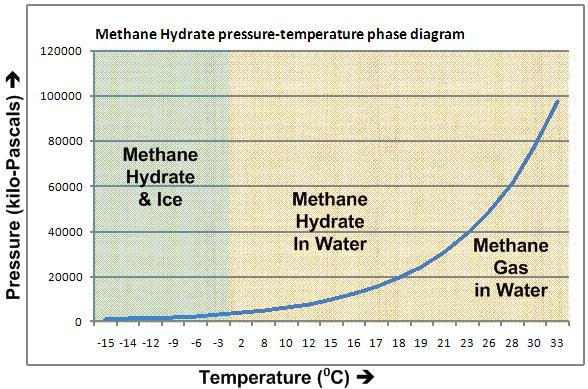
Methane clathrate is released as gas into the surrounding water column or soils when ambient temperature increases.

The clathrate gun hypothesis is a proposed explanation for the periods of rapid warming during the Quaternary. The hypothesis is that changes in fluxes in upper intermediate waters in the ocean caused temperature fluctuations that alternately accumulated and occasionally released methane clathrate on upper continental slopes. This would have had an immediate impact on the global temperature, as methane is a much more powerful greenhouse gas than carbon dioxide. Despite its atmospheric lifetime of around 12 years, methane's global warming potential is 72 times greater than that of carbon dioxide over 20 years, and 25 times over 100 years (33 when accounting for aerosol interactions). It is further proposed that these warming events caused the Bond cycles and individual interstadial events, such as the Dansgaard–Oeschger interstadials.

In 2018, a perspective piece devoted to tipping points in the climate system suggested that the climate change contribution from methane hydrates would be "negligible" by the end of the century, but could amount to 0.4–0.5 °C (0.72–0.90 °F) on the millennial timescales. In 2021, the IPCC Sixth Assessment Report no longer included methane hydrates in the list of potential tipping points, and says that "it is very unlikely that CH_{4} emissions from clathrates will substantially warm the climate system over the next few centuries." The report had also linked terrestrial hydrate deposits to gas emission craters discovered in the Yamal Peninsula in Siberia, Russia beginning in July 2014, but noted that since terrestrial gas hydrates predominantly form at a depth below 200 meters, a substantial response within the next few centuries can be ruled out. Likewise, a 2022 assessment of tipping points described methane hydrates as a "threshold-free feedback" rather than a tipping point.

=== Greenland ice sheet melting ===
A 2014 study found evidence for methane cycling below the ice sheet of the Russell Glacier, based on subglacial drainage samples which were dominated by Pseudomonadota bacteria. During the study, the most widespread surface melt on record for the past 120 years was observed in Greenland; on 12 July 2012, unfrozen water was present on almost the entire ice sheet surface (98.6%). The findings indicate that methanotrophs could serve as a biological methane sink in the subglacial ecosystem, and the region was, at least during the sample time, a source of atmospheric methane. Scaled dissolved methane flux during the four months of the summer melt season for the Russell Glacier catchment area (1200 km^{2}) was estimated at 990 tonnes CH_{4}. Because this catchment area is representative of similar Greenland outlet glaciers, the researchers concluded that the Greenland Ice Sheet may represent a significant global methane source.

A study in 2016 concluded that methane clathrates may exist below Greenland's and Antarctica's ice sheets, based on past evidence.

== Reducing methane emissions ==
More than half of global methane emissions originate from human activities across three main sectors: fossil fuels (35% of human-caused emissions), waste (20%), and agriculture (40%). Within the fossil fuel sector, oil and gas extraction, processing, and distribution contribute 23%, while coal mining accounts for 12% of these emissions. In the waste sector, landfills and wastewater comprise about 20% of global anthropogenic emissions. In agriculture, livestock emissions from manure and enteric fermentation make up roughly 32%, and rice cultivation contributes 8% of global anthropogenic emissions. Mitigation using available measures could reduce these methane emissions by about 180 Mt/yr or about 45% by 2030.

Mitigation of CO_{2} emissions by 2050 (i.e. reaching net zero emissions) is probably not enough to stop the future disappearance of summer Arctic Ocean ice cover. Mitigation of methane emissions is also necessary and this has to be carried out over an even shorter period of time.

=== Flaring methane from oil and gas operations ===
ARPA-E has funded a research project from 2021–2023 to develop a "smart micro-flare fleet" to burn off methane emissions at remote locations.

A 2012 review article stated that most existing technologies "operate on confined gas streams of 0.1% methane", and were most suitable for areas where methane is emitted in pockets.

If Arctic oil and gas operations use Best Available Technology (BAT) and Best Environmental Practices (BEP) in petroleum gas flaring, this can result in significant methane emissions reductions, according to the Arctic Council.

== See also ==
- Arctic dipole anomaly – Climate pattern
- Climate change in Antarctica – Impacts of climate change on Antarctica
- Effects of climate change
- Global Carbon Project – Global research project on greenhouse gas emissions
- Global Methane Initiative – International partnership to reduce methane emissions
- Peat – Accumulation of partially decayed vegetation
