= Gas venting =

Disposal of unwanted methane gas from fossil fuels

A diagram showing the geologic sources of alkane hydrocarbon gases which accompany the extraction of coal and crude oil, or which are themselves the target of extraction.

Gas venting, more specifically known as natural-gas venting or methane venting, is the intentional and controlled release of gases containing alkane hydrocarbons - predominately methane - into Earth's atmosphere. It is a widely used method for disposal of unwanted gases which are produced during the extraction of coal and crude oil. Such gases may lack value when they are not recyclable into the production process, have no export route to consumer markets, or are surplus to near-term demand. In cases where the gases have value to the producer, substantial amounts may also be vented from the equipment used for gas collection, transport, and distribution.

Gas venting contributes strongly to climate change. Nevertheless, many individual cases are sufficiently small and dispersed to be deemed "safe" with regard to immediate health hazards. Large and concentrated releases are usually abated with gas flares to produce relatively less-harmful carbon dioxide gas. Gas venting and flaring that are performed as routine practices are especially wasteful and may be eliminated in many modern industrial operations, where other low-cost options are available to utilize the gas.

Gas venting is not to be confused with similar types of gas release, such as those from:

- emergency pressure relief as a method of last resort to prevent equipment damage and safeguard life, or
- fugitive gas emissions which are unintentional gas leaks that occur in coal, oil, and gas operations, such as from orphan wells

Gas venting should also not be confused with "gas seepage" from the earth or oceans - either natural or due to human activity.

== Oil field practice relating to unwanted gas ==
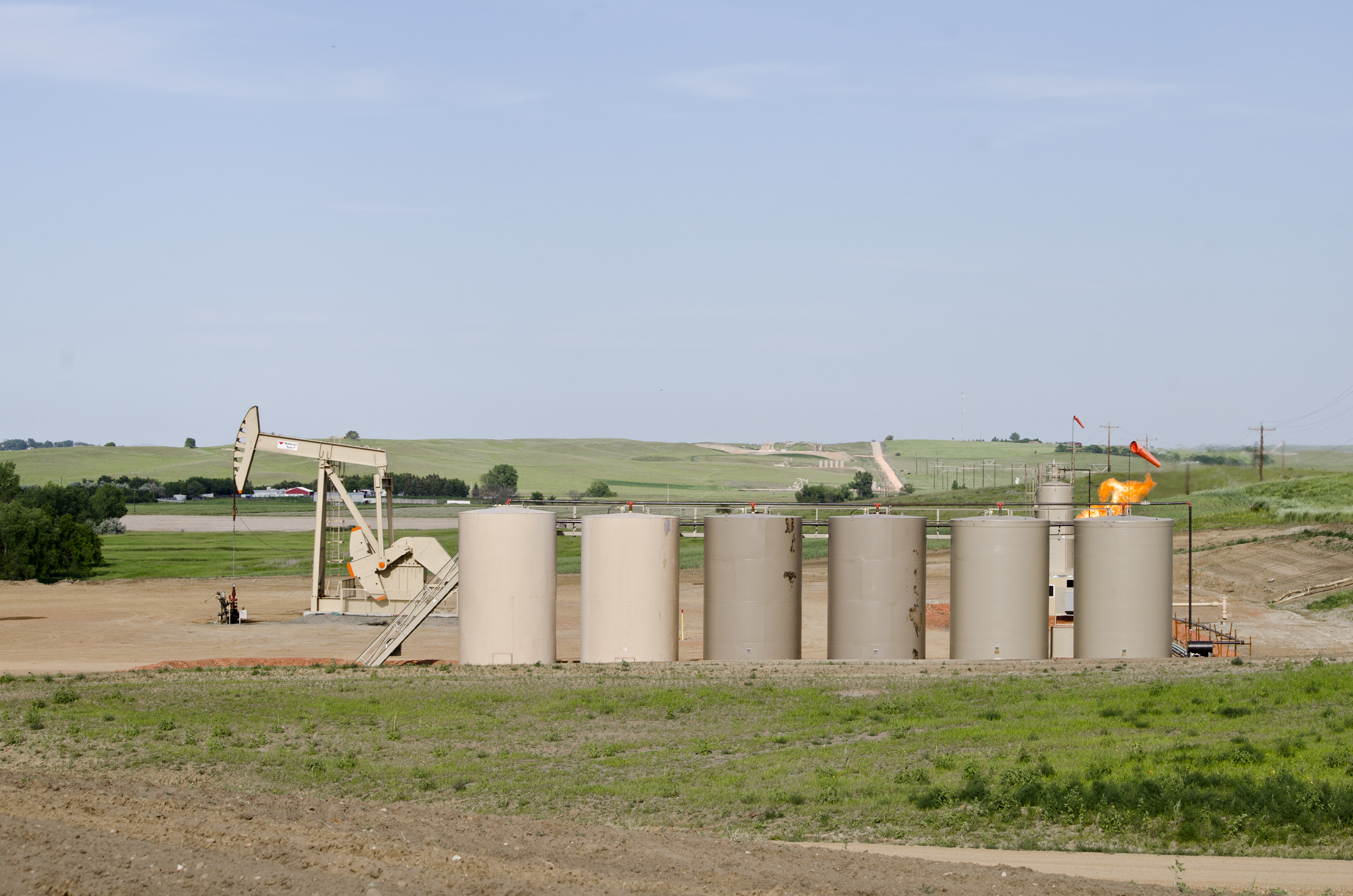
Petroleum extraction and storage with flaring of the associated gas at a rural site.

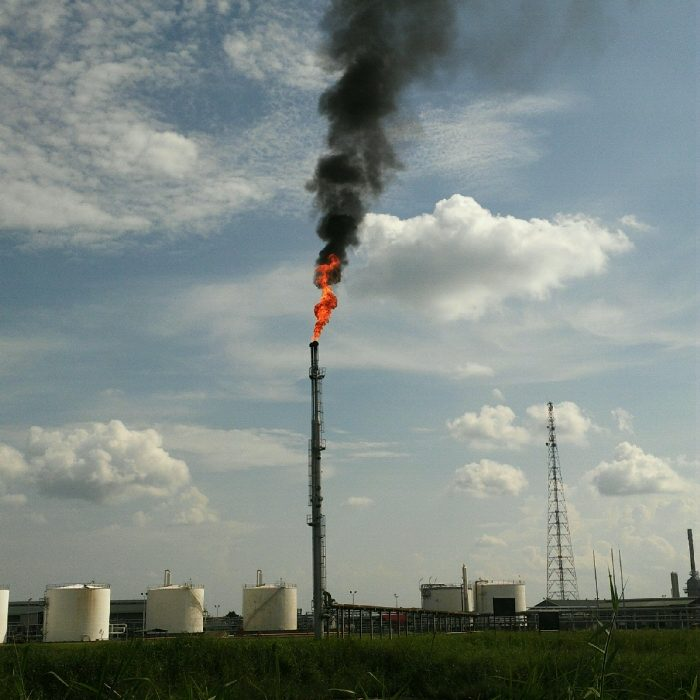
Incomplete gas flaring that also creates excessive black carbon.

Petroleum extraction from oil wells, where acquiring crude oil is the primary and sometimes sole financial objective, is generally accompanied by the extraction of substantial amounts of so-called associated petroleum gas (i.e. a form of raw natural gas). Global statistics from year 2012 show that the majority (58%) of this gas was re-injected for storage and to help maintain well pressure, 27% was sent to consumption markets, and the remaining 15% was vented or flared near the well site.

100 million tons of the vented associated gas was combusted in flares worldwide, equal to about 3-4% of all gas produced from oil and gas wells. The flared gas yielded nearly 350 million tons of CO_{2}-equivalent emissions of greenhouse gases, contributing about 1% of the 33 billion tons of carbon dioxide (CO_{2}) released from the burning of all fossil fuels. Flare Gas Recovery Systems (FGRS) are being increasingly implemented as a more economically productive alternative to flaring.

Preferably, all of the unwanted gas would at least be abated in gas flares, but this has not been achieved in practice. For example, the vented volumes from individual wells are sometimes too small and intermittent, and may present other difficulties (e.g. high concentrations of contaminants) that make flaring more technically and economically challenging. Also, gas will continue to effervesce from the crude oil for some time after it is moved into storage tanks at the well site and transported elsewhere. This gas may also be routed to a flare stack, utilized, or designed to escape without mitigation through vents or pressure regulators.

Global tracking estimates from the International Energy Agency (IEA) during year 2019 indicate that an additional 32 million tons of methane were vented without abatement from all petroleum extraction; including onshore conventional oil, offshore oil, unconventional oil, and downstream oil activities. When including the amount released from incomplete gas flares and fugitive emissions, the estimated total is about 37 million tons.

Matthew Johnson, from the Energy and Emissions Research Lab (EER) at Carleton University in Ottawa, Ontario, Canada, said in a December 2023 interview that—contrary to common beliefs—venting, particularly from heavy oil facilities designed for normal operations, is the primary source of methane emissions in the oil and gas industry. Johnson stresses the urgency of swiftly retrofitting oil and gas sites, considering that the associated costs are reasonable, based on various studies. The estimated cost for retrofitting for the total industry in Canada is estimated at $3.3 billion between 2027 and 2040 for implementing both venting and flaring requirements. Johnson said that while fossil fuels are not going to be phased out "overnight", "when it comes to methane emissions, we have a solution and we can implement it right now." A 2023 Energy and Emissions Research Lab report discusses challenges in meeting the 2030 methane reduction targets under the Global Methane Pledge, due to uncertainties in emission levels from oil and gas operations. The research, which centers on Alberta, Canada—the Canadian province with the largest oil and gas-industry—presents a methane inventory for 2021 that exceeds the official federal inventory by 1.5 times. The study underscores that nearly two-thirds of emissions—primarily stemming from uncontrolled tanks, pneumatics, and unlit flares, result from gas venting—indicating substantial opportunities for mitigation. Notably, methane intensities in Alberta are four times higher than those in neighboring British Columbia, highlighting the necessity for independent monitoring and reporting ensuring the success of emission reduction initiatives. Gas venting in the oil and gas industry has gained attention in Alberta, Canada, particularly in light of proposed legislative changes aimed at reducing methane emissions. Federal Environment Minister Steven Guilbeault presented a plan during the 2023 United Nations Climate Change Conference in Dubai, outlining a national cap-and-trade system to curb emissions without hindering production. The proposed framework aims to cap 2030 emissions at 35 to 38 percent below 2019 levels, aligning with the federal government's objective of achieving net-zero carbon emissions in the sector by 2050. Given that the oil and gas industry contributes to 28 percent of Canada's emissions, these proposed changes signal a significant effort to address environmental concerns and combat climate change.

== Coal mining and coalbed methane activity ==
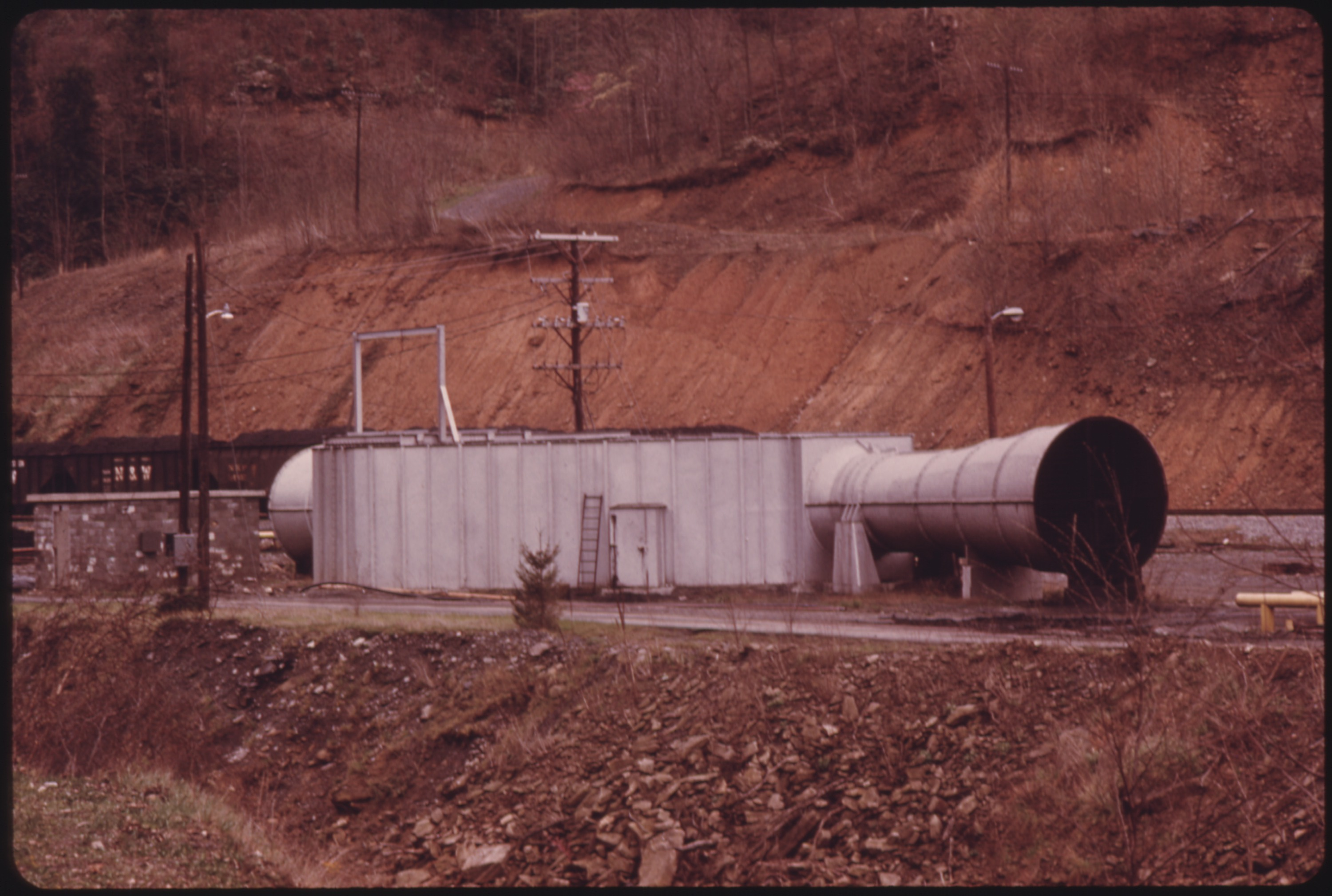
A large fan supplying fresh air to a mine ventilation shaft. Methane and coal dust are removed by exhaust air.

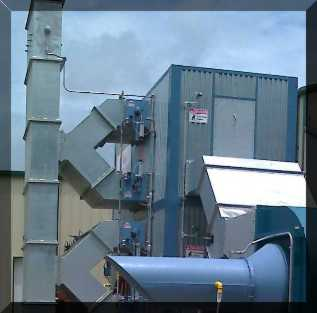
A ventilation air methane thermal oxidizer.

Substantial amounts of methane-rich gas are trapped and adsorbed within coal formations, and are unavoidably desorbed in association with coal mining. In some cases of sub-surface mining, a formation is permeated with boreholes prior to and/or during extraction work, and the so-called firedamp gases allowed to vent as a safety measure. Also during work, methane enters the ventilation air system at concentrations as high as 1%, and is usually freely exhausted from the mine opening. Such ventilation air methane (VAM) is the largest source of methane from all operating and decommissioned coal mines worldwide. Substantial methane also continues to desorb from coal placed into storage and from abandoned mines.

The U.S. Environmental Protection Agency projects that by year 2020, global methane releases from coal mines throughout the world will exceed 35 million tons or 800 million tons of CO_{2}-equivalent emissions, and account for 9% of all global methane emissions. China contributes over 50% of the total, followed by the United States (10%) and Russia (7%), and then by Australia, Ukraine, Kazakhstan, and India (3-4% each). About 200 mines across a broad scope of countries had implemented technology by the year 2015 to capture about 3 million tons of methane, either for economic use or for abatement in gas flares or thermal oxidizers.

Outcroppings, seams, or formations near the surface are also sometimes permeated with wells to extract and capture the methane, in which event it is classified as a form of unconventional gas. Such coalbed methane capture can reduce the volume of gas seepage that would otherwise occur naturally, while in-turn adding emissions of carbon dioxide once the fuel is utilized elsewhere.

Global tracking estimates from the IEA during 2019 suggest that about 40 million tons of methane were released from all activities related to coal mining. This total amount includes all vented, fugitive and seepage emissions.

== Gas field and gas pipeline practices ==
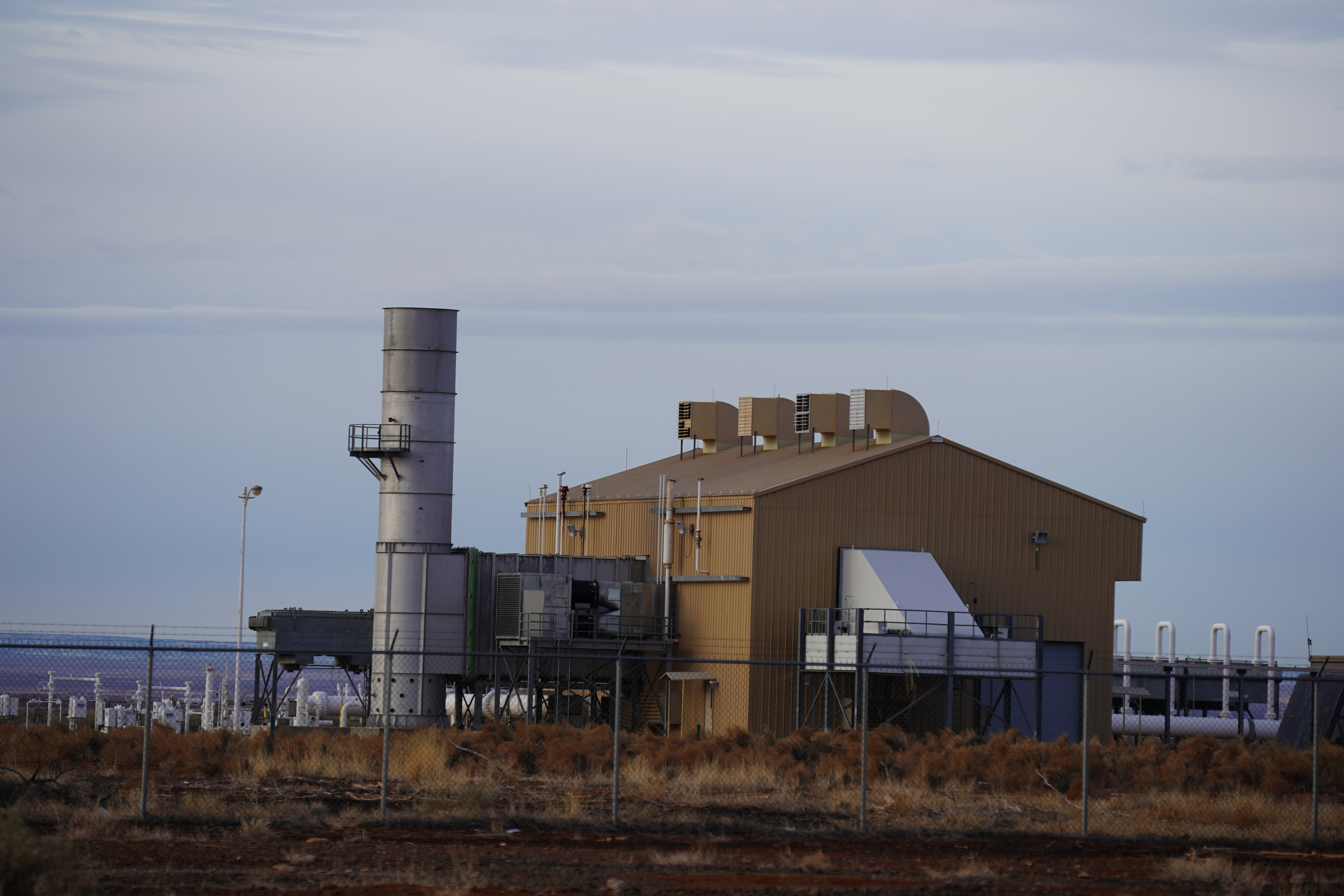
A gas pipeline compressor station. Gas is vented by design from the seals of some gas compressor equipment.

In gas fields, acquiring non-associated petroleum gas (i.e. another form of raw natural gas) is the primary financial objective, and very little is unwanted compared to the gas produced in oil fields or coal mines. The majority of venting emissions instead occur during the pipeline transport to trading & distribution hubs, refineries, and consumer markets.

The U.S. Department of Energy reports that a majority of the venting within U.S. gas industry operations in year 2017 occurred at compressor stations and from pneumatically operated controllers and regulators. Improved maintenance strategies and advanced equipment technologies either exist or are being developed to reduce such venting.

Global tracking estimates from the IEA during year 2019 further indicate that about 23 million tons of methane were vented from all gas industry segments, including onshore conventional gas, offshore gas, unconventional gas, and downstream gas activities. When including the amount released from fugitive emissions, the estimated total is about 43 million tons.

== Historical context ==
Associated petroleum and coal mining gases were sometimes considered troublesome, dangerous, low value: a "free" by-product associated with financially more lucrative coal or liquid hydrocarbon recovery that had to be dealt with. The growth of international gas markets, infrastructure and supply chains have done much to change this. It is also becoming more of a standard practice to:

- capture and use associated gas to provide local power, and to
- reinject re-compressed gas for oil reservoir pressure maintenance, secondary recovery, and potential later reservoir depressurization once hydrocarbon liquids recovery has been maximized and a gas export infrastructure and market access have been established.

Today, it is financially viable to develop even relatively small hydrocarbon reservoirs containing non-associated gas (i.e. with little or no oil) close to a market or export route, as well as large, remote accumulations.

Fossil gas was recently promoted by some industry advocates and policy makers as a "bridge fuel" that could yield the least waste, and thus environmental damage and accompanying economic losses, during the transition from finite fossil-fuel reserves to more sustainable sources. However, the actual volumes of methane released cumulatively over the supply chain have a near-term climate warming impact which already rivals, and may grow to exceed, that from using coal and oil.

== Environmental impact ==
Radiative forcing of different contributors to climate change in 2011, as reported in the fifth IPCC assessment report.

Venting and other releases of gaseous hydrocarbons have increased steadily throughout the industrial age alongside the rapid growth in production and consumption of fossil fuels. The International Energy Agency estimates that total annual methane emissions from the oil and gas industry alone rose from about 63 to 82 million tons over years 2000 thru 2019; an average increase of about 1.4% per year. Globally, the IEA estimates that the geologic extraction of coal, crude oil, and natural gas is responsible for 20% of all methane emissions. Other researchers have found evidence that their contribution may be substantially higher; 30% or greater.

Methane's atmospheric concentration has nearly doubled over the last century, and is already a factor 2.5 greater than at any point in the last 800,000 years. Methane is a potent warming gas despite its lower abundance compared to atmospheric carbon dioxide. Atmospheric methane is responsible for at least one-quarter and as much as one-third of the changes in radiative forcing that drive near-term climate warming.

The ethane, propane, and butane components of natural gas have much shorter atmospheric lifetimes (ranging from about 1 week to 2 months) compared to methane (1-2 decades) and carbon dioxide (1-2 centuries). They consequently do not become well-mixed into the atmosphere and have much lower atmospheric abundances. Nevertheless, their oxidation ultimately leads to the creation of longer-lived carbon compounds that also disturb the atmosphere and the planetary carbon cycle through a variety of complex pathways.

== See also ==
- Routine flaring
- Methane emissions
