= Ventilation air methane thermal oxidizer =

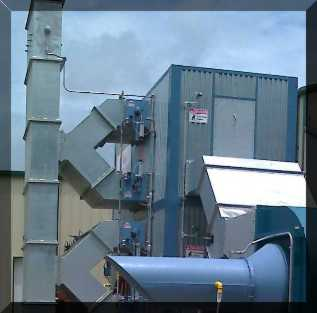

Ventilation air methane thermal oxidizers (or VAMTOX) are a type of processing equipment used for greenhouse gas abatement related to underground mining operations that destroys gaseous methane at a high temperature.

== Principle ==
Ventilation Air Methane Thermal Oxidizers are used to destroy methane in the exhaust air of underground coal mine shafts. Methane is a greenhouse gas that burns to form carbon dioxide (CO_{2}) and water vapour. Carbon dioxide is 25 times less potent than methane when emitted into the atmosphere with regards to global warming. Concentrations of methane in ventilation exhaust air of coal and trona mines are very dilute; typically below 1% and often below 0.5%. Flow rates are so high that ventilation air methane constitutes the largest source of methane emissions at most mines. This methane emission wastes energy and contributes significantly to global greenhouse gas (GHG) emissions.

== Operation ==
Thermal oxidation is the most widely accepted air pollution control technologies used in industrial applications. Ventilation Air Methane Thermal Oxidizers are commonly referred to as a VAMTOX. They are very specific and extremely efficient – energy recovery efficiency can reach 95%. This is achieved through the storage of heat in dense ceramic stoneware. Ventilation Air Methane Thermal Oxidizers are used for the very low methane concentrations operate continuously. These systems can destroy 95-98+% methane (CH_{4}) that would otherwise be emitted. Ventilation Air Methane Thermal Oxidizers can be designed with hot gas bypass systems, re-circulation heat exchangers that convert heat into energy, and oxygen monitoring to reduce any possible carbon monoxide and/or nitrous oxide production. Methane streams allow the VAMTOX to operate at reduced or zero fuel usage, which makes these systems ideal for mine shaft ventilation operations.

VAMTOX systems have a system of valves and dampers that direct the methane flow across the ceramic bed. On system start up, the system preheats and raises the temperature of the heat exchange material in the oxidizer bed to or above the auto-oxidation temperature of methane (1,000 °C or 1,832 °F). Then the preheating system is turned off and mine exhaust air is introduced. When the methane-filled air reaches the preheated bed, it oxidizes and releases heat. This heat is transferred to the bed, thereby maintaining its temperature to support continued operation. The oxidation process is flameless. Once the bed is preheated, the process needs no auxiliary energy so long as adequate inflow methane concentrations are maintained. The VAMTOX system exhaust gases can be used to raise steam, which can provide electrical power through a turbine generator.
