= Enteric fermentation =

Digestive process that emits methane

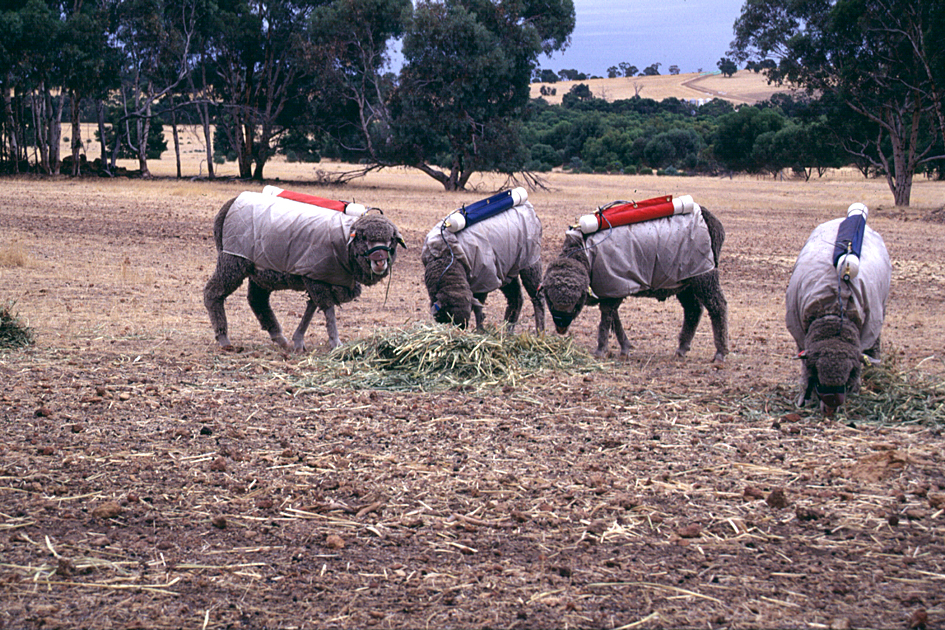
Experiment in Australia to capture exhaled methane from sheep

Enteric fermentation is a digestive process by which carbohydrates are broken down by microorganisms into simple molecules for absorption into the bloodstream of an animal. Food and Agriculture Organization (FAO) estimated that ruminant livestock contribute to around 34.5 percent of the total anthropogenic methane emissions.

== Ruminants ==
Ruminant animals are those that have a rumen. A rumen is a multichambered stomach found almost exclusively among some artiodactyl mammals, such as cattle, sheep, and deer, enabling them to eat cellulose-enhanced tough plants and grains that monogastric (i.e., "single-chambered stomached") animals, such as humans, dogs, and cats, cannot digest. Although camels are thought to be ruminants they are not true ruminants.

Enteric fermentation occurs when methane (CH_{4}) is produced in the rumen as microbial fermentation takes place. Over 200 species of microorganisms are present in the rumen, although only about 10% of these play an important role in digestion. Most of the CH_{4} byproduct is belched by the animal. However, a small percentage of CH_{4} is also produced in the large intestine and passed out as flatulence.

Methane emissions are an important contribution to global greenhouse gas emissions. The IPCC reports that methane is more than twenty times as effective as CO_{2} at trapping heat in the atmosphere - though note that it is produced in substantially smaller amounts. Methane represents also a significant energy loss to the animal ranging from 2 to 12% of gross energy intake. So, decreasing the production of enteric CH_{4} from ruminants without altering animal production is desirable both as a strategy to reduce global greenhouse gas emissions and as a means of improving feed conversion efficiency. In Australia ruminant animals account for over half of their green house gas contribution from methane.

However, in Australia there are ruminant species of the kangaroos that are able to produce 80% less methane than cows. This is because the gut microbiota of Macropodids, rumen and others parts of their digestive system, is dominated by bacteria of the family Succinivibrionaceae. These bacteria are able to produce succinate as a final product of the lignocelluloses degradation, producing small amounts of methane as end product. Its special metabolic route allows it to utilize other proton acceptors, avoiding the formation of methane.

== Experimental management ==
Enteric fermentation was the second largest anthropogenic source of methane emissions in the United States from 2000 through 2009. In 2007, methane emissions from enteric fermentation were 2.3% of net greenhouse gases produced in the United States at 139 teragrams of carbon dioxide equivalents (Tg CO_{2}) out of a total net emission of 6087.5 Tg CO_{2}. For this reason, scientists believe that, with the aid of microbial engineering, the use of microbioma to modify natural or anthropogenic processes, we could change the microbiota composition of the rumen of strong methane producers, emulating the Macropodidae microbiota.

Recent studies claim that this technique is possible to perform. In one of these studies scientists analyze the changes of human microbiota by different alimentary changes. In other study, researchers introduce a human microbiota in gnotobiotic mice in order to compare the different changes for developing new ways to manipulate the properties of the microbiota so as to prevent or treat various diseases.

Another approach to manage methane emissions from enteric fermentation involves using diet additives and supplements in cattle feed. For example, Asparagopsis taxiformis (also known as red seaweed) is a species of algae that when fed to cattle has shown to substantially reduce their methane emissions in feedlots. A second example that has been shown to reduce methane emissions from cattle significantly in feedlots involves using the compound 3-nitroxypropanol (3-NOP) which inhibits the final step of methane synthesis by microorganisms in the rumen. Some of these methods have already been approved for farmer usage, while others continue to be evaluated for safety, efficacy, and other concerns. These approaches comes with limitations as feedlot emissions represent around 11% of overall cattle emissions.

== See also ==
- Environmental impact of meat production#Greenhouse gas emissions
- Atmospheric methane
