= Global Methane Initiative =

International partnership to reduce methane emissions

Coordinates: 38°52′57.3″N 76°59′24.7″W

Global Methane Initiative (GMI)
- Formation: 16 November 2004
- Headquarters: 1200 Pennsylvania Ave., NW; Washington, DC 20460 USA
- Board of directors: Janet McCabe, chair
- Parent organization: United States Environmental Protection Agency
- Affiliations: United Nations Framework Convention on Climate Change, European Commission, U.S. Department of Energy
- Website: globalmethane.org
- Formerly called: Methane to Markets Partnership

The Global Methane Initiative (GMI) is a voluntary, international partnership that brings together national governments, private sector entities, development banks, NGOs and other interested stakeholders in a collaborative effort to reduce methane gas emissions and advance methane recovery and use as a clean energy source. National governments are encouraged to join GMI as Partner Countries, while other non-State organizations may join GMI's extensive Project Network. As a public-private initiative, GMI creates an international platform to build capacity, development methane abatement strategies, engage in technology transfer, and remove political and economic barriers to project development for emissions reduction.

The initiative currently focuses on five sectors, which are known sources of anthropogenic methane emissions: agriculture, coal mining, municipal solid waste, municipal wastewater, and oil and gas systems.

Through international cooperation, GMI seeks to reduce global methane emissions, the second largest contributor to atmospheric concentrations of greenhouse gases, in order to enhance economic growth, promote energy security, improve the environment, and reduce greenhouse gases. Other expected benefits include improving mine safety, reducing waste, and improving local air quality.

== History and Organization ==
The partnership initiative known as GMI, began as the "Methane to Markets Partnership" launched during the George W. Bush Administration in November 2004. The original partnership was formed at a Ministerial Meeting in Washington, D.C. when 14 national governments formally committed to reduce methane emissions from key sectors. In 2004, the U.S. pledged US$53 million over an initial five-year period.

The partnership assumed a new name—the Global Methane Initiative (GMI) -- under the Obama Administration, in 2010, when the U.S. pledged an additional US$50 million to support GMI. The scope of GMI activities has since expanded into other sectors.

GMI brings together state and non-state actors in a collaborative public-private partnership. GMI is the only international effort to specifically target methane abatement, recovery and use by focusing on five key sectors of anthropogenic emissions: agriculture, coal mines, municipal solid waste, municipal wastewater, and oil and gas systems. The Initiative complements other international agreements to reduce greenhouse gas emissions such as the United Nations Framework Convention on Climate Change.

GMI's Steering Committee guides the work and activities of the partnership on a broad level. The Steering Committee is supported by the Secretariat—also known as the Administrative Support Group (ASG), which is housed at the United States Environmental Protection Agency (EPA).

GMI directs five technical sector subcommittees: the Agricultural Subcommittee; Coal Mines Subcommittee; Municipal Solid Waste (MSW) Subcommittee; Municipal Wastewater Subcommittee; and Oil and Gas Subcommittee. The 5 subcommittees guide GMI's sector-specific activities and promote GMI's methane abatement and recovery strategies among the Partner Countries and Project Network members. Each subcommittee has developed an action plan to coordinate and implement GMI activities.

== Subcommittees ==
Agriculture Subcommittee: The agricultural sector is one of the key sectors of focus for GMI. The partnership focuses on mitigating methane emitted during the decomposition of livestock manure and the organic components in agro-industrial wastewater. The subcommittee works with members of the international community to install anaerobic digestion systems and biogas production technology in agricultural regions around the world. Anaerobic digesters turn livestock and agro-industrial waste—otherwise a large source of methane emissions—into biogas for use on farms or within the local community.

Coal Mines Subcommittee: Methane is emitted from both underground and surface coal mining operations, including both active and abandoned mines. Methane is also emitted from post-mining activities such as processing, storage and transportation. The GMI Coal Mines Subcommittee seeks to development coal mine methane (CMM) projects to advance methane recovery and use at coal mines.

Municipal Solid Waste Subcommittee: Methane is emitted from municipal solid waste (MSW) landfills around the world, although opportunities exist to reduce methane emissions by collecting landfill gas containing methane and converting it into a source of fuel. Methane emissions from landfills can also be reduced through better waste management, such as modifying waste collection practices. The MSW Subcommittee works with GMI members to develop climate-friendly MSW solutions.

Municipal Wastewater Subcommittee: The Municipal Wastewater Subcommittee was launched in October 2011, making it GMI's newest sector-specific subcommittee. Within the wastewater sector, methane is produced when organic matter in wastewater decomposes. Depending on management practices, methane is emitted during the collection, handling and treatment of wastewater. The Municipal Wastewater Subcommittee works with GMI partners to develop and employ management practices that reduce the amount of methane emitted from wastewater operations.

Oil and Gas Subcommittee: Methane is emitted from oil and gas systems during both normal operations and systems disruption. Methane losses from oil and gas systems account for more than 20 percent of total methane emissions worldwide. The amount of methane emitted from a facility depends on equipment type and condition, maintenance procedures and the frequency of maintenance, and operations at the facility under consideration. The subcommittee works with project members to reduce methane emissions from oil and gas activities.

== Membership ==
The initiative intends to pursue its goals through collaboration among developed countries, developing countries, and countries with economies in transition—along with participation from the private sector, development banks, and other governmental and non-governmental organizations.

On 16 November 2004, 14 countries launched the original initiative by signing the Terms of Reference document that outlines the initiative's goals, organization, and functions. As of February 2015, 41 countries and the European Commission have joined the initiative. GMI Partner Countries together contribute approximately 70 percent of the world's anthropogenic methane emissions. Through GMI, cumulative methane emission reductions have totalled more than 159 million metric tons of carbon dioxide equivalent (MMTCO2e).

- Albania
- Argentina*
- Australia*
- Brazil*
- China*
- Colombia*
- Bulgaria
- Canada
- Chile
- Dominican Republic
- Ecuador
- Ethiopia
- European Union
- Finland
- Georgia
- Germany
- Ghana
- India*
- Indonesia
- Italy*
- Japan*
- Jordan
- Kazakhstan
- Mexico*
- Mongolia
- Nicaragua
- Nigeria*
- Norway
- Pakistan
- Peru
- Philippines
- Poland
- Saudi Arabia
- Serbia
- South Korea
- Sri Lanka
- Thailand
- Turkey
- Russia*
- Ukraine*
- United Kingdom*
- United States*
- Vietnam

* Founding partner from 2004

== Project Examples ==
Gas Cogeneration Project in Poland: In 2011, GMI funded a feasibility study showing that it was economically feasible to extract methane from the abandoned Zory Coal Mine in Poland for conversion to liquefied natural gas. The report estimated that the project could eliminate 490,000 billion [cubic metre|cubic meters] in methane emissions annually. Based on these findings, a 2-megawatt combined heat and power cogeneration unit was installed. The plant is fuelled with gas extracted from the abandoned mine. The power and thermal energy generated at the plant produces ~46,500 kilowatt-hours of energy per day—enough to power more than 11,000 households.

Waste Management in Nigeria: In 2011, GMI awarded a grant to the Nigerian Lagos Waste Management Authority (LAWMA) for studies evaluating the feasibility of capturing landfill gas from the Abule Egba and Solous Landfills. Based on their findings, LAWMA developed a landfill gas energy project, which provides a reliable source of electricity to local residents.

== Technology Examples ==
EPOD: Westgen's EPOD technology provides cost effective instrument air to remote well-sites to eliminate methane venting from pneumatic devices, while reducing capital costs, reducing operating costs, improving reliability and generating carbon credits for oil and gas producers. We believe that Canada can lead the industry in responsible energy development – changing how the industry is viewed worldwide and finding innovative ways to continue to grow in a sustainable and environmentally conscious way. Westgen's mission is to develop technologies behind responsible energy development by reducing environmental impact and improving efficiencies in design.
