= Methane emissions =

Sources of methane gas in Earth's atmosphere

Sources of methane emissions due to human activity (year 2020 estimates)
1. Fossil Fuel Use (33.0%)
2. Animal Agriculture (30.0%)
3. Plant Agriculture (18.0%)
4. Waste (15.0%)
5. All Other (4.00%)

Methane emissions

Increasing methane emissions are a major contributor to the rising concentration of greenhouse gases in Earth's atmosphere, and are responsible for up to one-third of near-term global heating. During 2019, about 60% (360 million tons) of methane released globally was from human activities, while natural sources contributed about 40% (230 million tons). During 2024, it was estimated that 610 million tons of methane were released globally with nearly two-thirds of it being from human activity. Reducing methane emissions by capturing and utilizing the gas can produce simultaneous environmental and economic benefits.

Since the Industrial Revolution, concentrations of methane in the atmosphere have more than doubled, and about 20 percent of the warming the planet has experienced can be attributed to the gas. About one-third (33%) of anthropogenic emissions are from gas release during the extraction and delivery of fossil fuels; mostly due to gas venting and gas leaks from both active fossil fuel infrastructure and orphan wells. As of 2024, the United States is the world's top methane emitter from oil and gas, while China stands at the top for methane emissions from coal. The International Energy Agency (IEA) highlights that abandoned coal mines and oil and gas wells have become significant sources of methane emissions. If considered a country, these emissions would rank as the fourth-largest globally, surpassing those of Iran. The IEA estimates that addressing over 8 million abandoned onshore oil and gas sites would cost about $100 billion.

Animal agriculture is a similarly large source (30%), primarily because of enteric fermentation by ruminant livestock such as cattle and sheep. According to the Global Methane Assessment published in 2021, methane emissions from livestock (including cattle) are the largest sources of agricultural emissions worldwide A single cow can make up to 99 kg of methane gas per year. Ruminant livestock can produce 250 to 500 L of methane per day.

Human consumer waste flows, especially those passing through landfills and wastewater treatment, have grown to become a third major category (18%). Plant agriculture, including both food and biomass production, constitutes a fourth group (15%), with rice production being the largest single contributor.

The world's wetlands contribute about three-quarters (75%) of the enduring natural sources of methane. Seepages from near-surface hydrocarbon and clathrate hydrate deposits, volcanic releases, wildfires, and termite emissions account for much of the remainder. Contributions from the surviving wild populations of ruminant mammals are vastly overwhelmed by those of cattle, humans, and other livestock animals.

The Economist recommended setting methane emissions targets as a reduction in methane emissions would allow for more time to tackle the more challenging carbon emissions".

== Atmospheric concentration and warming influence ==
Growth and acceleration of emissions, and resulting atmospheric concentration

Methane emissions from fossil fuels, industrial and agricultural practices have increased since the industrial revolution.

Trendline of year-over-year increases demonstrates the persistent growth of methane emissions since the 1950s.

About 60% of current methane emissions are human-caused, contributing to the growth of methane gas in the atmosphere.

The atmospheric methane (CH_{4}) concentration is increasing and exceeded 1931 parts per billion in 2024, equal to 2.6 times the pre-industrial level. The methane itself causes direct radiative forcing that is second only to that of carbon dioxide (CO_{2}). Due to interactions with oxygen compounds stimulated by sunlight, CH_{4} can also increase the atmospheric presence of shorter-lived ozone and water vapour, themselves potent warming gases: atmospheric researchers call this amplification of methane's near-term warming influence indirect radiative forcing. When such interactions occur, longer-lived and less-potent CO_{2} is also produced. Including both the direct and indirect forcings, the increase in atmospheric methane is responsible for about one-third of near-term global heating.

Though methane causes far more heat to be trapped than the same mass of carbon dioxide, less than half of the emitted CH_{4} remains in the atmosphere after a decade. On average, carbon dioxide warms for much longer, assuming no change in rates of carbon sequestration. The global warming potential (GWP) is a way of comparing the warming due to other gases to that from carbon dioxide, over a given time period. Methane's GWP_{20} of 85 means that a ton of CH_{4} emitted into the atmosphere creates approximately 85 times the atmospheric warming as a ton of CO_{2} over a period of 20 years. On a 100-year timescale, methane's GWP_{100} is in the range of 28–34.

Methane emissions are important as reducing them can buy time to tackle carbon emissions.

== Overview of emission sources ==
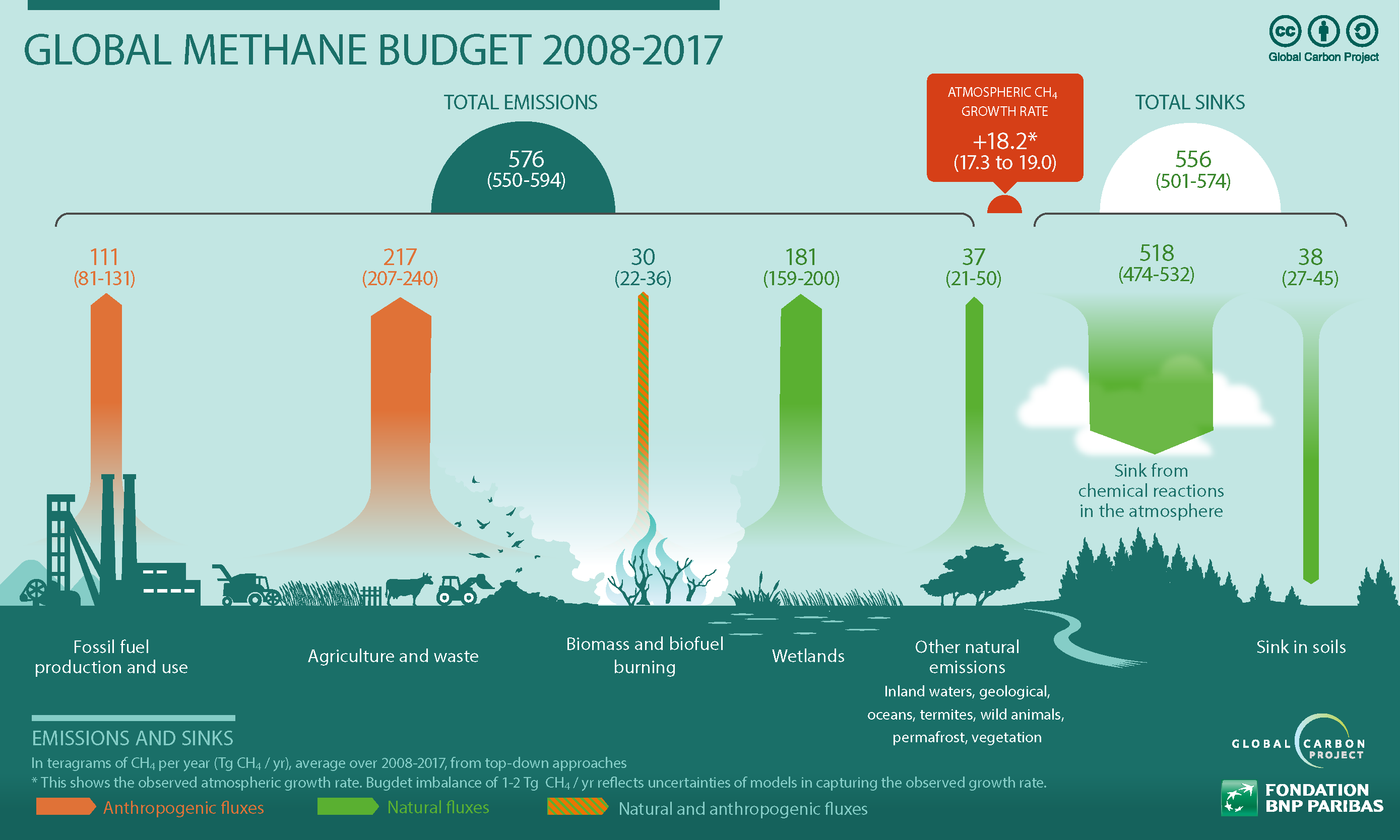
The main sources of methane for the decade 2008–2017, estimated by the Global Carbon Project

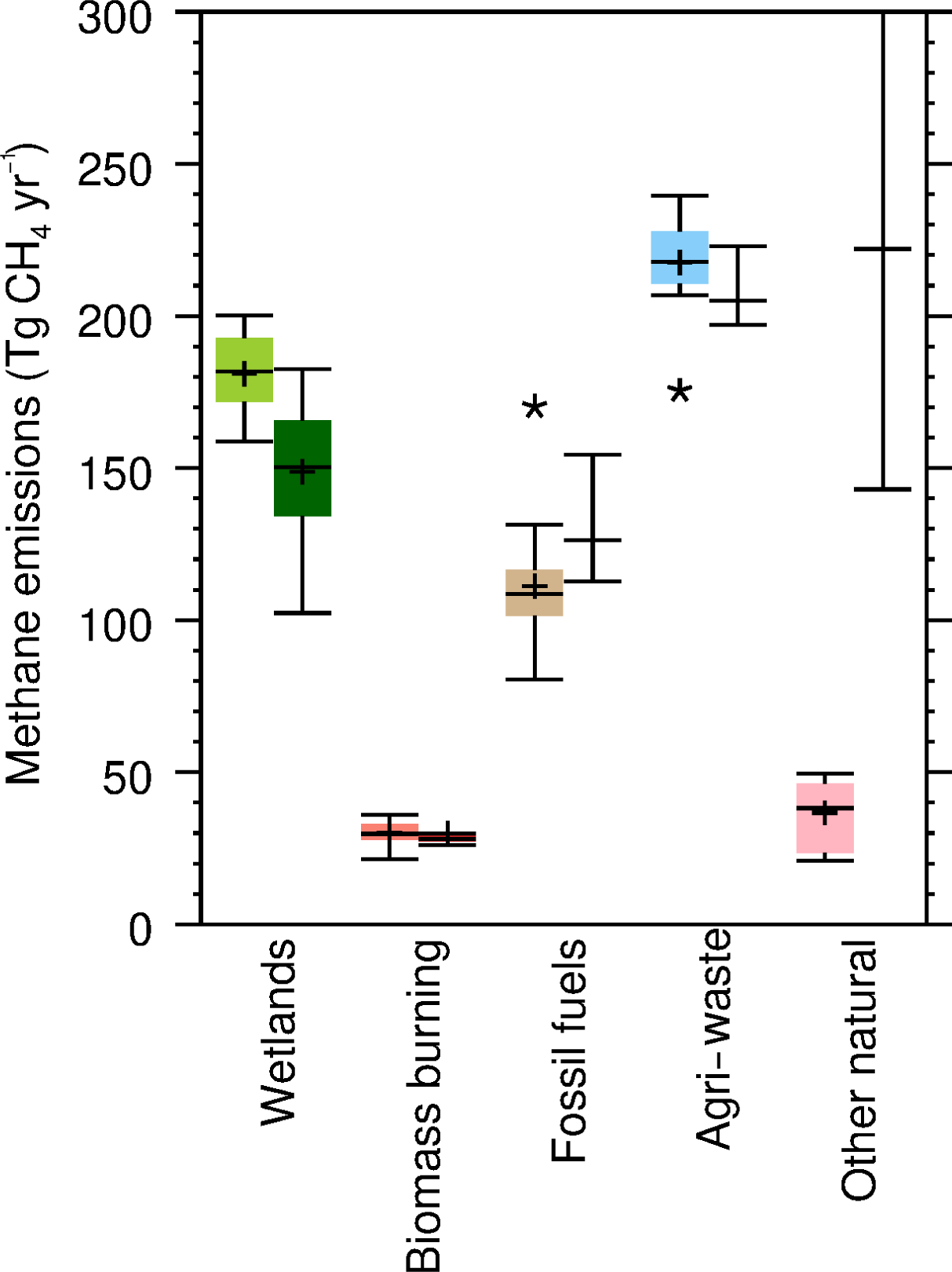
"Methane global emissions from the five broad categories for the 2008–2017 decade for top-down inversion models and for bottom-up models and inventories (right dark coloured box plots).

Biogenic methane is actively produced by microorganisms in a process called methanogenesis. Under certain conditions, the process mix responsible for a sample of methane may be deduced from the ratio of the isotopes of carbon, and through analysis methods similar to carbon dating.

=== Anthropogenic ===
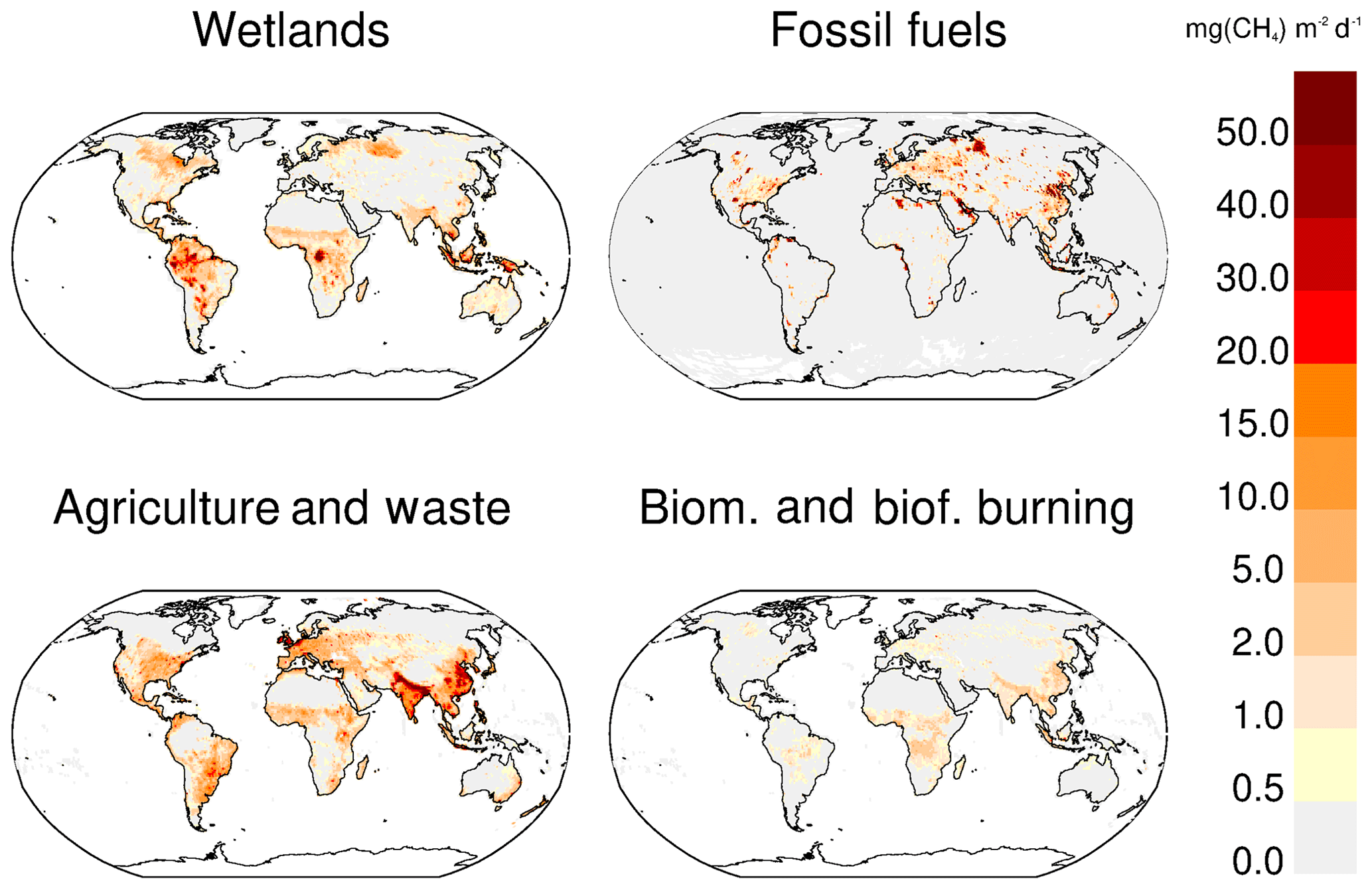
Map of methane emissions from four source categories

Global methane emissions by sector over time

Methane emissions agriculture

As of 2024, emission volumes from some sources remain more uncertain than others; due in part to localized emission spikes not captured by the limited global measurement capability. The time required for a methane emission to become well-mixed throughout earth's troposphere is about 1–2 years.

Satellite data indicate over 80% of the growth of methane emissions during 2010–2019 are tropical terrestrial emissions.

There is accumulating research and data showing that oil and gas industry methane emissions – or from fossil fuel extraction, distribution and use – are much larger than thought.

Category	Major Sources	IEA Annual Emission 2023 (Million Tons)
Fossil fuels	Gas distribution	29
Fossil fuels	Oil wells	49*
Fossil fuels	Coal mines	40
Biofuels	Anaerobic digestion	10
Industrial agriculture	Enteric fermentation	142
Industrial agriculture	Rice paddies	142
Industrial agriculture	Manure management	142
Biomass	Biomass burning	10
Consumer waste	Solid waste Landfill gas	71
Consumer waste	Wastewater	71
Total anthropogenic		351
* An additional 100 million tons (140 billion cubic meters) of gas is flared each year from oil wells. Additional References:

=== Natural ===
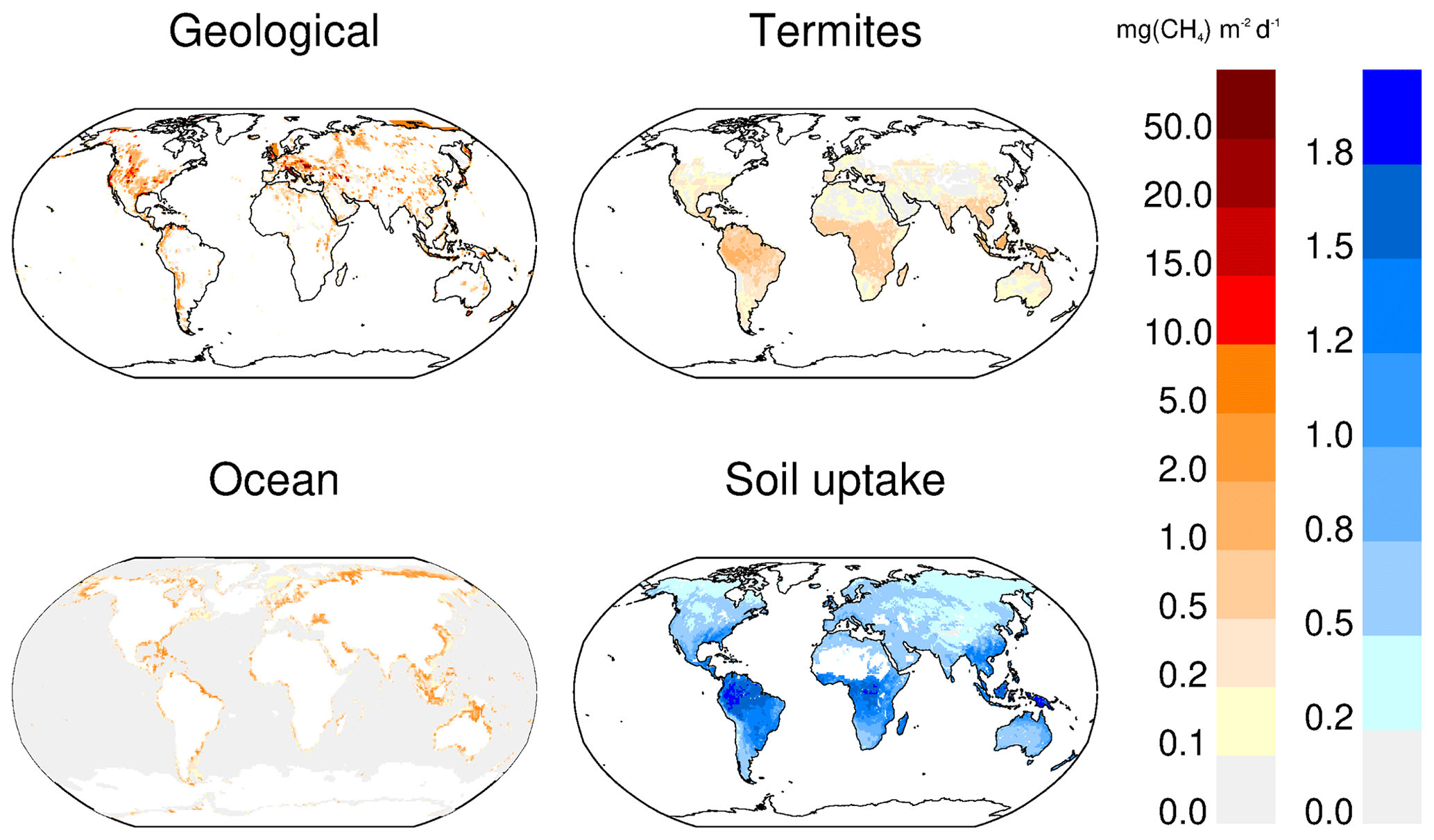
Map of methane emissions from three natural sources and one sink

Natural sources have always been a part of the methane cycle. Wetland emissions have been declining due to draining for agricultural and building areas.

Category	Major Sources	IEA Annual Emission 2023 (Million Tons)
Wetlands	Wetland methane	194
Other natural	Geologic seepages Volcanic gas	39
Other natural	Arctic methane emissions	39
Other natural	Ocean sediments	39
Other natural	Wildfires	39
Other natural	Termites	39
Total natural		233
Additional References:

==== Methanogenesis ====
Most ecological emissions of methane relate directly to methanogens generating methane in warm, moist soils as well as in the digestive tracts of certain animals. Methanogens are methane producing microorganisms. In order to produce energy, they use an anaerobic process called methanogenesis. This process is used in lieu of aerobic, or with oxygen, processes because methanogens are unable to metabolise in the presence of even small concentrations of oxygen. When acetate is broken down in methanogenesis, the result is the release of methane into the surrounding environment.

Methanogenesis, the scientific term for methane production, occurs primarily in anaerobic conditions because of the lack of availability of other oxidants. In these conditions, microscopic organisms called archaea use acetate and hydrogen to break down essential resources in a process called fermentation.

Acetoclastic methanogenesis – certain archaea cleave acetate produced during anaerobic fermentation to yield methane and carbon dioxide.

H_{3}C-COOH → CH_{4} + CO_{2}

Hydrogenotrophic methanogenesis – archaea oxidize hydrogen with carbon dioxide to yield methane and water.

4H_{2} + CO_{2} → CH_{4} + 2H_{2}O

While acetoclastic methanogenesis and hydrogenotrophic methanogenesis are the two major source reactions for atmospheric methane, other minor biological methane source reactions also occur. For example, it has been discovered that leaf surface wax exposed to UV radiation in the presence of oxygen is an aerobic source of methane.

==== Natural methane cycles ====
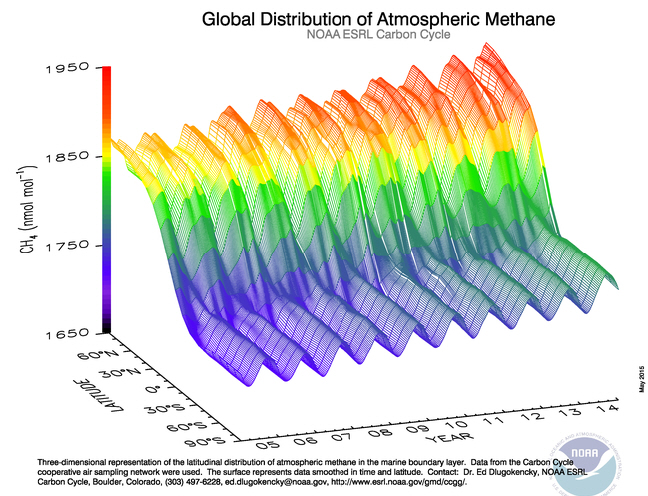
Methane observations from 2005 to 2014 showing the seasonal variations and the difference between northern and southern hemispheres

Its concentration is higher in the Northern Hemisphere since most sources (both natural and human) are located on land and the Northern Hemisphere has more land mass. The concentrations vary seasonally, with, for example, a minimum in the northern tropics during April−May mainly due to removal by the hydroxyl radical.

For example, plants that produce methane can emit as much as two to four times more methane during the day than during the night. This is directly related to the fact that plants tend to rely on solar energy to enact chemical processes.

==== Wetlands ====
Greenhouse gas emissions from wetlands of concern consist primarily of methane and nitrous oxide emissions. Wetlands are the largest natural source of atmospheric methane in the world, and are therefore a major area of concern with respect to climate change. Wetlands account for approximately 20–30% of atmospheric methane through emissions from soils and plants, and contribute an approximate average of 161 Tg of methane to the atmosphere per year.

Wetlands are characterized by water-logged soils and distinctive communities of plant and animal species that have adapted to the constant presence of water. This high level of water saturation creates conditions conducive to methane production. Most methanogenesis, or methane production, occurs in oxygen-poor environments. Because the microbes that live in warm, moist environments consume oxygen more rapidly than it can diffuse in from the atmosphere, wetlands are the ideal anaerobic environments for fermentation as well as methanogen activity. However, levels of methanogenesis fluctuates due to the availability of oxygen, soil temperature, and the composition of the soil. A warmer, more anaerobic environment with soil rich in organic matter would allow for more efficient methanogenesis.

Some wetlands are a significant source of methane emissions and some are also emitters of nitrous oxide. Nitrous oxide is a greenhouse gas with a global warming potential 300 times that of carbon dioxide and is the dominant ozone-depleting substance emitted in the 21st century. Wetlands can also act as a sink for greenhouse gases.

In wetlands, where the rate of methane production is high, plants help methane travel into the atmosphere—acting like inverted lightning rods as they direct the gas up through the soil and into the air. They are also suspected to produce methane themselves, but because the plants would have to use aerobic conditions to produce methane, the process itself is still unidentified, according to a 2014 Biogeochemistry article.

A 1994 article on methane emissions from northern wetlands said that since the 1800s, atmospheric methane concentrations increased annually at a rate of about 0.9%.

== Human-caused methane emissions ==
The AR6 of the IPCC said, "It is unequivocal that the increases in atmospheric carbon dioxide (CO_{2}), methane (CH_{4}), and nitrous oxide (N_{2}O) since the pre-industrial period are overwhelmingly caused by human activities." Atmospheric methane accounted for 20% of the total radiative forcing (RF) from all of the long-lived and globally mixed greenhouse gases.

According to the 2021 assessment by the Climate and Clean Air Coalition (CCAC) and the United Nations Environment Programme (UNEP) over 50% of global methane emissions are caused by human activities in fossil fuels (35%), waste (20%), and agriculture (40%). The oil and gas industry accounts for 23%, and coal mining for 12%. Twenty percent of global anthropogenic emissions stem from landfills and wastewater. Manure and enteric fermentation represent 32%, and rice cultivation represents 8%.

The most clearly identified rise in atmospheric methane as a result of human activity occurred in the 1700s during the industrial revolution. During the 20th century—mainly because of the use of fossil fuels—concentration of methane in the atmosphere increased, then stabilized briefly in the 1990s, only to begin to increase again in 2007. After 2014, the increase accelerated and by 2017, reached 1,850 parts per billion. From 2020 to 2024, the increase continued, going from 1875 ppb to 1931 ppb in 2020 and 2024 respectively.

Increases in methane levels due to modern human activities arise from a number of specific sources including industrial activity; from extraction of oil and natural gas from underground reserves; transportation via pipeline of oil and natural gas; and thawing permafrost in Arctic regions, due to global warming which is caused by human use of fossil fuels.

The primary component of natural gas is methane, which is emitted to the atmosphere in every stage of natural gas "production, processing, storage, transmission, and distribution".

=== Emissions due to oil and gas extraction ===
A 2005 Wuppertal Institute for Climate, Environment and Energy article identified pipelines that transport natural gas as a source of methane emissions. The article cited the example of Trans-Siberian natural gas pipeline system to western and Central Europe from the Yamburg and Urengoy exist gas fields in Russia with a methane concentration of 97%. In accordance with the IPCC and other natural gas emissions control groups, measurements had to be taken throughout the pipeline to measure methane emissions from technological discharges and leaks at the pipeline fittings and vents. Although the majority of the natural gas leaks were carbon dioxide, a significant amount of methane was also being consistently released from the pipeline as a result of leaks and breakdowns. In 2001, natural gas emissions from the pipeline and natural gas transportation system accounted for 1% of the natural gas produced. Between 2001 and 2005, this was reduced to 0.7%, the 2001 value was significantly less than that of 1996.

A 2012 Climatic Change article and 2014 publication by a team of scientists led by Robert W. Howarth said that there was strong evidence that "shale gas has a larger GHG footprint than conventional gas, considered over any time scale. The GHG footprint of shale gas also exceeds that of oil or coal when considered at decadal time scales." Howarth called for policy changes to regulate methane emissions resulting from hydraulic fracturing and shale gas development.

A 2013 study by a team of researchers led by Scot M. Miller, said that U.S. greenhouse gas reduction policies in 2013 were based on what appeared to be significant underestimates of anthropogenic methane emissions. The article said, that "greenhouse gas emissions from agriculture and fossil fuel extraction and processing"—oil and/or natural gas—were "likely a factor of two or greater than cited in existing studies." By 2001, following a detailed study anthropogenic sources on climate change, IPCC researchers found that there was "stronger evidence that most of the observed warming observed over the last 50 years [was] attributable to human activities." Since the Industrial Revolution humans have had a major impact on concentrations of atmospheric methane, increasing atmospheric concentrations roughly 250%. According to the 2021 IPCC report, 30–50% of the current rise in temperatures is caused by emissions of methane, and reducing methane is a fast way of climate change mitigation. An alliance of 107 countries, including Brazil, the EU and the U.S., have joined the pact known as the Global Methane Pledge, committing to a collective goal of reducing global methane emissions by at least 30% from 2020 levels by 2030.

The European Union adopted methane regulations in 2024. The law requires oil and gas developers to monitor, measure, and report methane emissions. Producers must stop flaring unused natural gas and use satellite imagery to detect leaks.

=== Animals and livestock ===
Ruminant animals, particularly cows and sheep, contain bacteria in their gastrointestinal systems that help to break down plant material. Some of these microorganisms use the acetate from the plant material to produce methane, and because these bacteria live in the stomachs and intestines of ruminants, whenever the animal "burps" or defecates, it emits methane as well. Based upon a 2012 study in the Snowy Mountains region, the amount of methane emitted by one cow is equivalent to the amount of methane that around 3.4 hectares of methanotrophic bacteria can consume. research in the Snowy Mountains region of Australia showed 8 tonnes of methane oxidized by methanotrophic bacteria per year on a 1,000 hectare farm. 200 cows on the same farm emitted 5.4 tonnes of methane per year. Hence, one cow emitted 27 kg of methane per year, while the bacteria oxidized 8 kg per hectare. The emissions of one cow were oxidized by 27/8 ≈ 3.4 hectare.

Termites also contain methanogenic microorganisms in their gut. However, some of these microorganisms are so unique that they live nowhere else in the world except in the third gut of termites. These microorganisms also break down biotic components to produce ethanol, as well as methane byproduct. However, unlike ruminants who lose 20% of the energy from the plants they eat, termites only lose 2% of their energy in the process. Thus comparatively, termites do not have to eat as much food as ruminants to obtain the same amount of energy, and give off proportionally less methane.

In 2001, NASA researchers confirmed the vital role of enteric fermentation in livestock on global warming. A 2006 UN FAO report reported that livestock generate more greenhouse gases as measured in CO_{2} equivalents than the entire transportation sector. Livestock accounts for 9% of anthropogenic CO_{2}, 65% of anthropogenic nitrous oxide and 37% of anthropogenic methane. Since then, animal science and biotechnology researchers have focused research on methanogens in the rumen of livestock and mitigation of methane emissions.

Nicholas Stern, the author of the 2006 Stern Review on climate change has stated "people will need to turn vegetarian if the world is to conquer climate change". In 2003, the National Academy of Sciences's president, Ralph Cicerone—an atmospheric scientist—raised concerns about the increase in the number of methane-producing dairy and beef cattle was a "serious topic" as methane was the "second-most-important greenhouse gas in the atmosphere".

Approximately 5% of the methane is released via the flatus, whereas the other 95% is released via eructation. Vaccines are under development to reduce the amount introduced through eructation. Asparagopsis seaweed as a livestock feed additive has reduced methane emissions by more than 80%.

=== Waste ===
==== Landfills ====
Due to the large collections of organic matter and availability of anaerobic conditions, landfills are the third largest source of atmospheric methane in the United States, accounting for roughly 18.2% of methane emissions globally in 2014. When waste is first added to a landfill, oxygen is abundant and thus undergoes aerobic decomposition; during which time very little methane is produced. However, generally within a year oxygen levels are depleted and anaerobic conditions dominate the landfill allowing methanogens to take over the decomposition process. These methanogens emit methane into the atmosphere and even after the landfill is closed, the mass amount of decaying matter allows the methanogens to continue producing methane for years.

==== Waste water treatment ====
Waste water treatment facilities act to remove organic matter, solids, pathogens, and chemical hazards as a result of human contamination. Methane emission in waste treatment facilities occurs as a result of anaerobic treatments of organic compounds and anaerobic biodegradation of sludge.

=== Release of stored methane from the Arctic ===
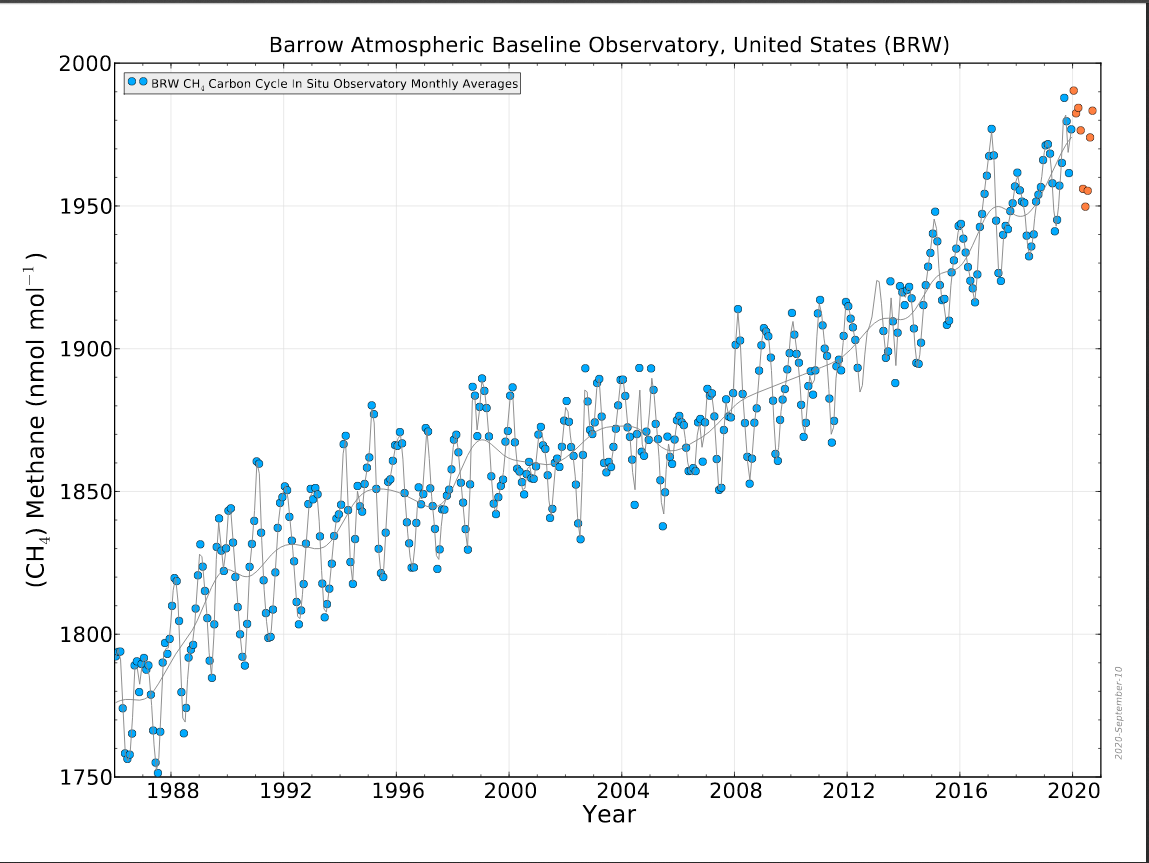
Methane concentrations in Utqiaġvik, Alaska (formerly known as Barrow)

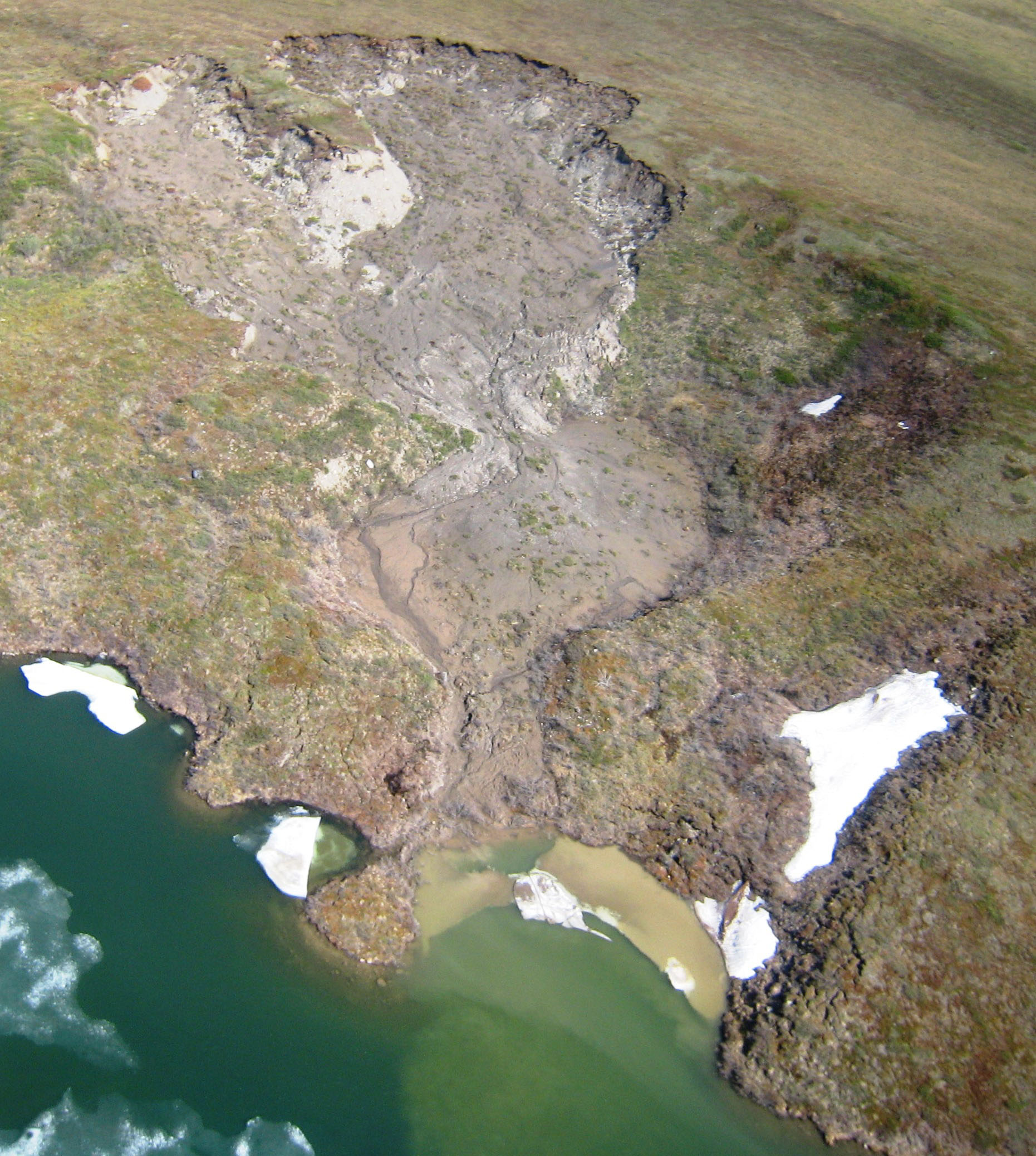
Image showing thawed permafrost resulting in thermokarst, a source of methane released from permafrost.

Arctic methane emissions contribute to a rise in methane concentrations in the atmosphere. Whilst the Arctic region is one of many natural sources of the greenhouse gas methane, there is nowadays also a human component to this due to the effects of climate change. In the Arctic, the main human-influenced sources of methane are thawing permafrost, Arctic sea ice melting, clathrate breakdown and Greenland ice sheet melting. This methane release results in a positive climate change feedback (that is, one that amplifies warming), as methane is a powerful greenhouse gas. When permafrost thaws due to global warming, large amounts of organic material can become available for methanogenesis and may therefore be released as methane.

Since around 2018, there have been consistent increases in global levels of methane in the atmosphere, with the 2020 increase of 15.06 parts per billion breaking the previous record increase of 14.05 ppb set in 1991, and 2021 setting an even larger increase of 18.34 ppb. However, there is currently no evidence connecting the Arctic to this recent acceleration. In fact, a 2021 study indicated that the methane contributions from the Arctic were generally overestimated, while the contributions of tropical regions were underestimated.

Nevertheless, the Arctic's role in global methane trends is considered very likely to increase in the future. There is evidence for increasing methane emissions since 2004 from a Siberian permafrost site into the atmosphere linked to warming.

Mitigation of CO_{2} emissions by 2050 (i.e. reaching net zero emissions) is probably not enough to stop the future disappearance of summer Arctic Ocean ice cover. Mitigation of methane emissions is also necessary and this has to be carried out over an even shorter period of time. Such mitigation activities need to be carried out in three main sectors: oil and gas, waste and agriculture. Using available measures this could amount to global reductions of ca.180 Mt/yr or about 45% of the current (2021) emissions by 2030.

=== Others ===
==== Aquatic ecosystems ====
Natural and anthropogenic methane emissions from aquatic ecosystems are estimated to contribute about half of total global emissions. Urbanization and eutrophication are expected to lead to increased methane emissions from aquatic ecosystems.

==== Ecological conversion ====
Conversion of forests and natural environments into agricultural plots increases the amount of nitrogen in the soil, which inhibits methane oxidation, weakening the ability of the methanotrophic bacteria in the soil to act as sinks. Additionally, by changing the level of the water table, humans can directly affect the soil's ability to act as a source or sink. The relationship between water table levels and methane emission is explained in the wetlands section of natural sources.

==== Rice agriculture ====
Rice agriculture is a significant source of methane. With warm weather and water-logged soil, rice paddies act like wetlands, but are generated by humans for the purpose of food production. Due to the swamp-like environment of rice fields, these paddies emitted about 30 of the 400 million metric tons of anthropogenic methane in 2022.

==== Biomass burning ====
Incomplete burning of both living and dead organic matter results in the emission of methane. While natural wildfires can contribute to methane emissions, the bulk majority of biomass burning occurs as a result of humans – including everything from accidental burnings by civilians to deliberate burnings used to clear out land to biomass burnings occurring as a result of destroying waste.

==== Oil and natural gas supply chain ====
Methane is a primary component of natural gas, and thus during the production, processing, storage, transmission, and distribution of natural gas, a significant amount of methane is lost into the atmosphere.

According to the EPA Inventory of U.S Greenhouse Gas Emissions and Sinks: 1990–2015 report, 2015 methane emissions from natural gas and petroleum systems totaled 8.1 Tg per year in the United States. Individually, the EPA estimates that the natural gas system emitted 6.5 Tg per year of methane while petroleum systems emitted 1.6 Tg per year of methane. Methane emissions occur in all sectors of the natural gas industry, from drilling and production, through gathering and processing and transmission, to distribution. These emissions occur through normal operation, routine maintenance, fugitive leaks, system upsets, and venting of equipment. In the oil industry, some underground crude contains natural gas that is entrained in the oil at high reservoir pressures. When oil is removed from the reservoir, associated gas is produced.

However, a review of methane emissions studies reveals that the EPA Inventory of Greenhouse Gas Emissions and Sinks: 1990–2015 report likely significantly underestimated 2015 methane emissions from the oil and natural gas supply chain. The review concluded that in 2015 the oil and natural gas supply chain emitted 13 Tg per year of methane, which is about 60% more than the EPA report for the same time period. The authors write that the most likely cause for the discrepancy is an under sampling by the EPA of so-called "abnormal operating conditions", during which large quantities of methane can be emitted.

2015 methane emissions from oil and natural gas supply chain in the United States (Tg per year)
Supply chain segment	EPA Inventory of U.S. Greenhouse Gas Emissions and Sinks: 1990–2015 report	Alvarez et al. 2018
Oil and natural gas production	3.5	7.6
Natural gas gathering	2.3	2.6
Natural gas transmission and storage	1.4	1.8
Natural gas processing	0.44	0.72
Natural gas local distribution	0.44	0.44
Oil refining and transportation	0.034	0.034
Total (95% confidence interval)	8.1 (6.7–10.2)	13 (11.3–15.1)

==== Coal mining ====
In 2014 NASA researchers reported the discovery of a 2,500 square miles (6,500 km^{2}) methane cloud floating over the Four Corners region of the south-west United States. The discovery was based on data from the European Space Agency's Scanning Imaging Absorption Spectrometer for Atmospheric Chartography instrument from 2002 to 2012.

The report concluded that "the source is likely from established gas, coal, and coalbed methane mining and processing." The region emitted 590,000 metric tons of methane every year between 2002 and 2012—almost 3.5 times the widely used estimates in the European Union's Emissions Database for Global Atmospheric Research. In 2019, the International Energy Agency (IEA) estimated that the methane emissions leaking from the world's coalmines are warming the global climate at the same rate as the shipping and aviation industries combined.

==== Methane gas from methane clathrates ====
At high pressures, such as are found on the bottom of the ocean, methane forms a solid clathrate with water, known as methane hydrate. An unknown, but possibly very large quantity of methane is trapped in this form in ocean sediments. Researchers are investigating possible changes in this process (clathrate gun hypothesis).

However, the 2021 IPCC Sixth Assessment Report found that it was "very unlikely that gas clathrates (mostly methane) in deeper terrestrial permafrost and subsea clathrates will lead to a detectable departure from the emissions trajectory during this century".

==== Methane slip from gas engines ====
The use of natural gas and biogas in internal combustion engines for such applications as electricity production, cogeneration and heavy vehicles or marine vessels such as LNG carriers using the boil off gas for propulsion, emits a certain percentage of unburned hydrocarbons of which 85% is methane. The climate issues of using gas to fuel internal combustion engines may offset or even cancel out the advantages of less CO_{2} and particle emissions is described in this 2016 EU Issue Paper on methane slip from marine engines: "Emissions of unburnt methane (known as the 'methane slip') were around 7 g per kg LNG at higher engine loads, rising to 23–36 g at lower loads. This increase could be due to slow combustion at lower temperatures, which allows small quantities of gas to avoid the combustion process". Road vehicles run more on low load than marine engines causing relatively higher methane slip.

== Global methane emissions monitoring ==
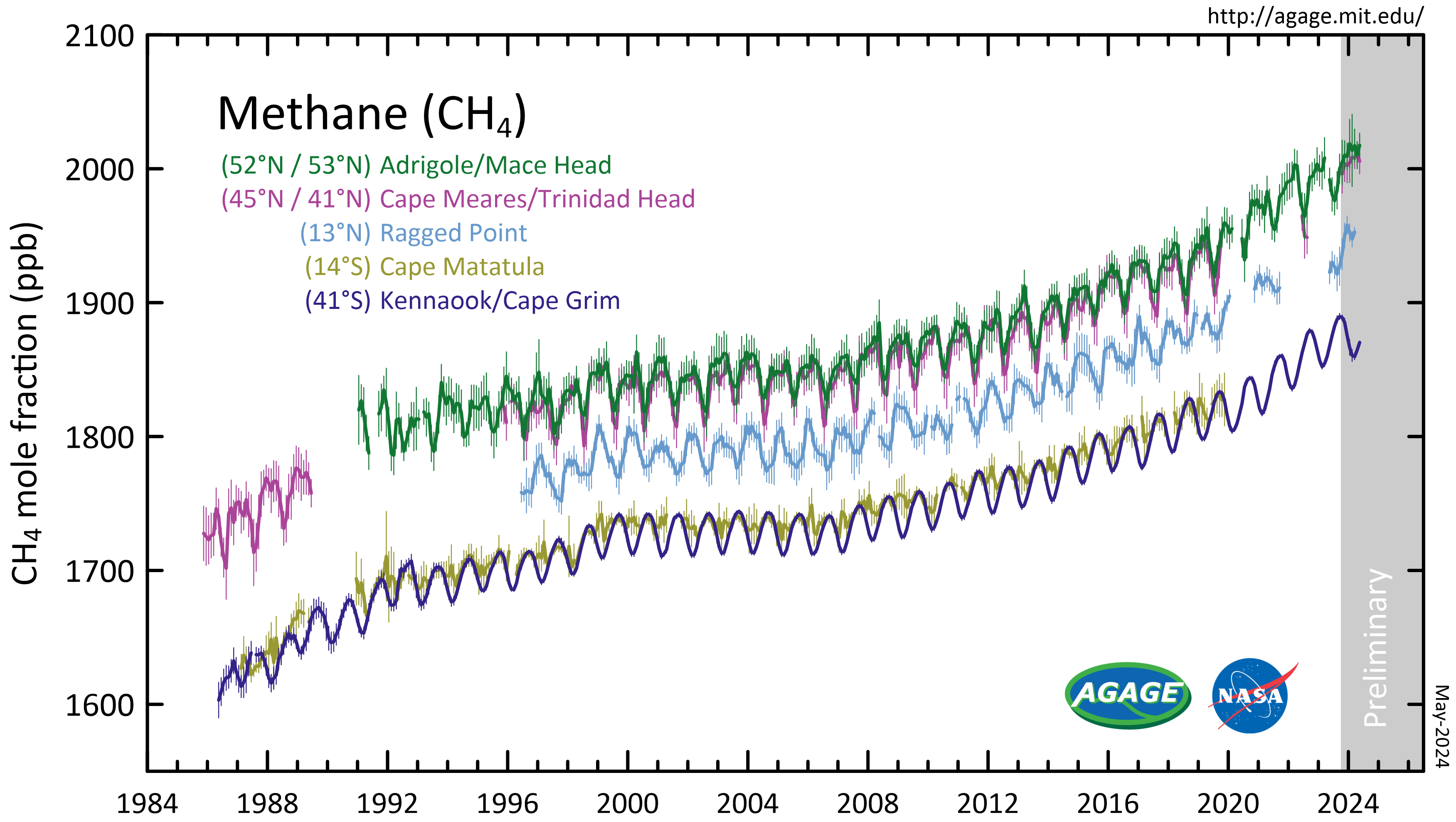
Methane (CH_{4}) measured by the Advanced Global Atmospheric Gases Experiment (AGAGE) in the lower atmosphere (troposphere) at stations around the world. Abundances are given as pollution free monthly mean mole fractions in parts-per-billion.

The Tropospheric Monitoring Instrument aboard the European Space Agency's Sentinel-5P spacecraft launched in October 2017 provides the most detailed methane emissions monitoring which is publicly available. It has a resolution of about 50 square kilometres.

MethaneSAT is under development by the Environmental Defense Fund in partnership with researchers at Harvard University, to monitor methane emissions with an improved resolution of 1 kilometer. MethaneSAT is designed to monitor 50 major oil and gas facilities, and could also be used for monitoring of landfills and agriculture. It receives funding from Audacious Project (a collaboration of TED and the Gates Foundation), and is projected to launch as soon as 2024.

In 2023, 12 satellites were deployed by GHGSat for monitoring methane emissions.

Uncertainties in methane emissions, including so-called "super-emitter" fossil extractions and unexplained atmospheric fluctuations, highlight the need for improved monitoring at both regional and global scale. Satellites have recently begun to come online with capability to measure methane and other more powerful greenhouse gases with improving resolution.

The Tropomi instrument on Sentinel-5 launched in 2017 by the European Space Agency can measure methane, sulphur dioxide, nitrogen dioxide, carbon monoxide, aerosol, and ozone concentrations in earth's troposphere at resolutions of several kilometers. In 2022, a study using data from the instrument monitoring large methane emissions worldwide was published; 1,200 large methane plumes were detected over oil and gas extraction sites. NASA's EMIT instrument also identified super-emitters. A 50% increase was observed in large methane emissions events detected by satellites in 2023 compared to 2022.

Japan's GOSAT-2 platform launched in 2018 provides similar capability.

The Claire satellite launched in 2016 by the Canadian firm GHGSat uses data from Tropomi to home in on sources of methane emissions as small as 15 m^{2}.

Other satellites are planned that will increase the precision and frequency of methane measurements, as well as provide a greater ability to attribute emissions to terrestrial sources. These include MethaneSAT, expected to be launched in 2022, and CarbonMapper.

Global maps combining satellite data to help identify and monitor major methane emission sources are being built.

The International Methane Emissions Observatory was created by the UN.

== Quantifying the global methane budget ==
In order to mitigate climate change, scientists have been focusing on quantifying the global methane CH_{4} budget as the concentration of methane continues to increase—it is now second after carbon dioxide in terms of climate forcing. Further understanding of atmospheric methane is necessary in "assessing realistic pathways" towards climate change mitigation. Various research groups give the following values for methane emissions:

Estimates of the global methane budget (in Tg(CH_{4})/yr)
Reference:	Fung et al. (1991)	Hein et al. (1997)	Lelieveld et al. (1998)	Houweling et al. (1999)	Bousquet et al. (2006)	Saunois et al. (2016)	Saunois et al. (2020)
Base year:	1980s	–	1992	–	–	2003–2012	2008-2017
Natural sources
Wetlands	115	237	225 (Note: Rice included under wetlands.)	145	147±15	167 (127–202)	181 (159-200)
Termites	20	–	20	20	23±4	64 (21–132)	37 (21–50)
Ocean	10	–	15	15	19±6	64 (21–132)	37 (21–50)
Hydrates	5	–	10	–	–	64 (21–132)	37 (21–50)
Anthropogenic sources
Energy	75	97	110	89	110±13	105 (77–133)	111 (81-131)
Landfills	40	35	40	73	55±11 (Note: Landfills total includes domestic sewage and animal waste.)	188 (115-243)	217 (207-240)
Ruminants (livestock)	80	90 (Note: Waste treatment included under ruminants.)	115	93		188 (115-243)	217 (207-240)
Waste treatment	–		25	–		188 (115-243)	217 (207-240)
Rice agriculture	100	88		–	31±5	188 (115-243)	217 (207-240)
Biomass burning	55	40	40	–	50±8	34 (15–53)	30 (22-36)
Other	–	–	–	20	90±14 (Note: Contains a small amount of natural emissions from wild ruminants)	34 (15–53)	30 (22-36)
Sinks
Soils	10		30	40	21±3	33 (28–38)	38 (27-45)
Tropospheric OH	450	489	510		448±1	515	518 (474–532)
Stratospheric loss		46	40		37±1	515	518 (474–532)
Source versus sink imbalance
Total source	500	587	600		525±8	558 (540–568)	576 (550-594)
Total sink	460	535	580		506	548	556 (501–574)

== National reduction policies ==
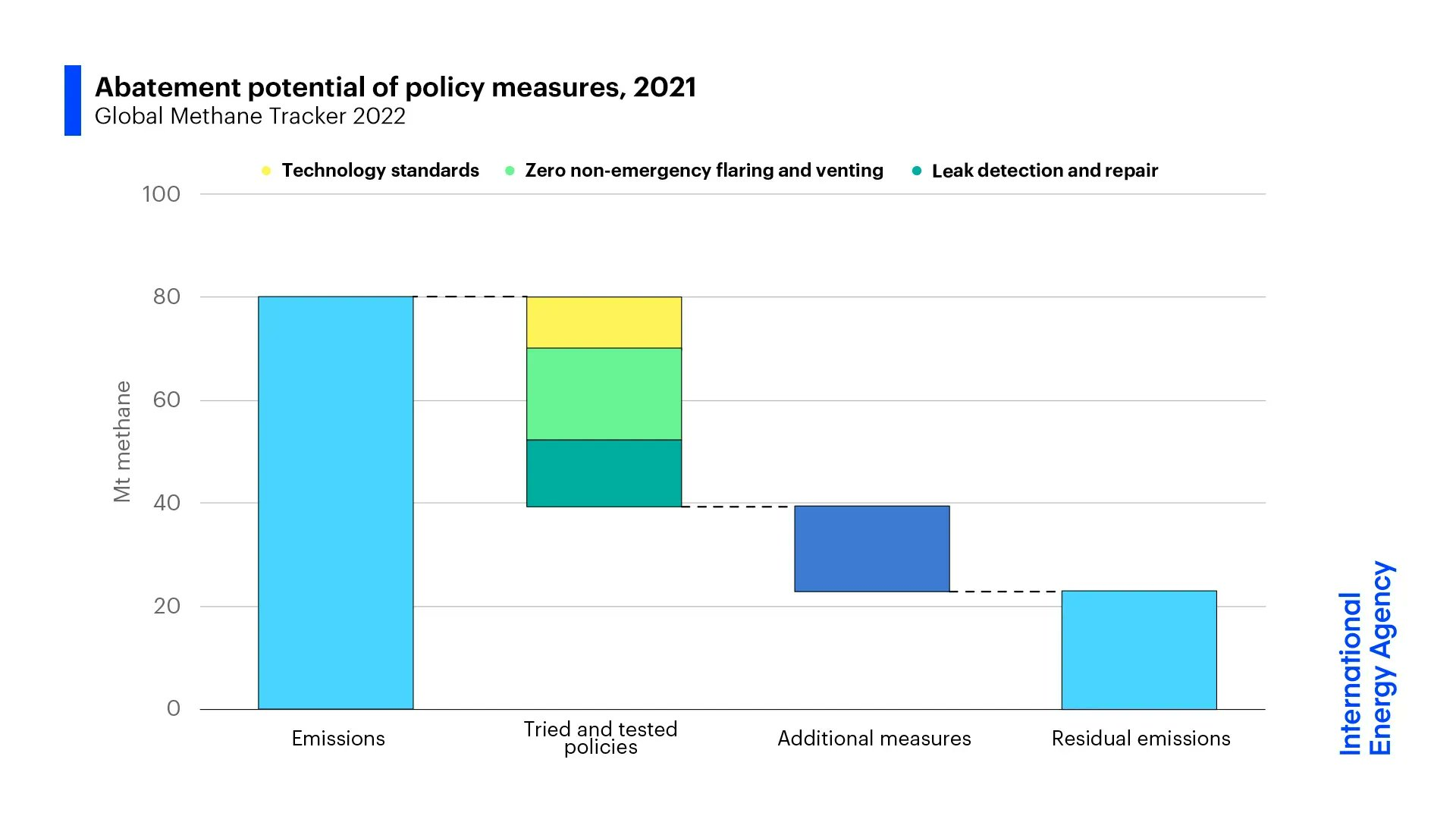
An International Energy Agency graphic showing the potential of various emission reduction policies for addressing global methane emissions

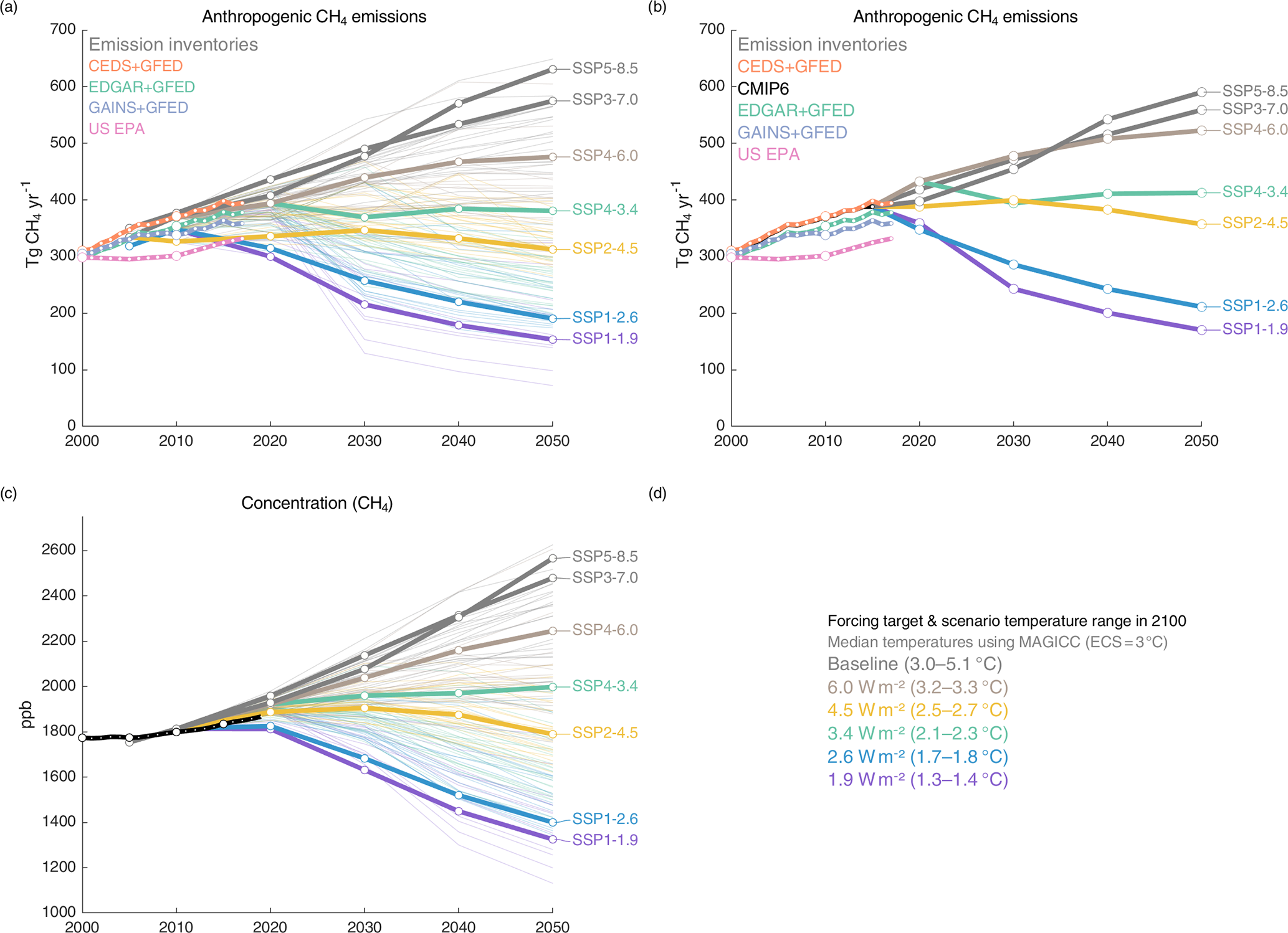
Global anthropogenic methane emissions from historical inventories and future Shared Socioeconomic Pathways (SSP) projections

China implemented regulations requiring coal plants to either capture methane emissions or convert methane into CO_{2} in 2010. According to a Nature Communications paper published in January 2019, methane emissions instead increased 50 percent between 2000 and 2015.

In March 2020, Exxon called for stricter methane regulations, which would include detection and repair of methane leaks, minimization of venting and releases of unburned methane, and reporting requirements for companies. However, in August 2020, the U.S. Environmental Protection Agency rescinded a prior tightening of methane emission rules for the U.S. oil and gas industry.

The EU Methane Regulation (EU/2024/1787) is the European Union's first binding law on reducing methane emissions in the energy sector. It aims to reduce methane emissions into the atmosphere from the oil, gas and coal sectors, both in the EU and its global supply chains.

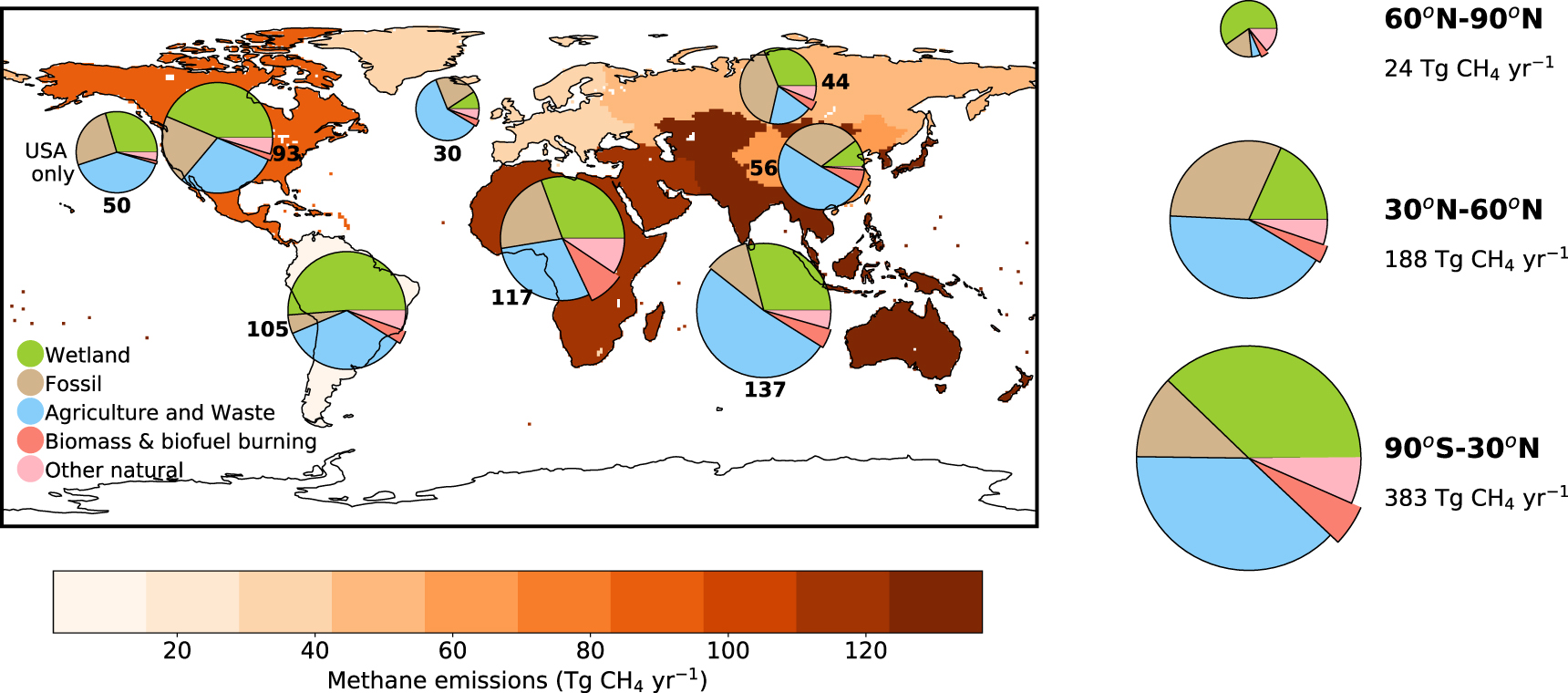
Methane emissions for 2017 by region, source category, and latitude

== Approaches to reduce emissions ==
=== Natural gas industries ===
About 40% of methane emissions from the fossil fuel industry could be "eliminated at no net cost for firms", according to the International Energy Agency (IEA) by using existing technologies. Forty percent represents 9% of all human methane emissions.

To reduce emissions from the natural gas industries, the EPA developed the Natural Gas STAR Program, also known as Gas STAR.

The Coalbed Methane Outreach Program (CMOP) helps and encourages the mining industry to find ways to use or sell methane that would otherwise be released from the coal mine into the atmosphere.

In 2023, the European Union agreed to legislation that will require fossil fuel companies to monitor and report methane leaks and to repair them within a short time period. The law also compels remediation of methane venting and methane flaring. The United States and China stated that they will include methane reduction targets in their next climate plans but have not enacted rules that would compel monitoring, reporting or repair of methane leaks.

=== Livestock ===
In order to counteract the amount of methane that ruminants give off, a type of drug called monensin (marketed as rumensin) has been developed. This drug is classified as an ionophore, which is an antibiotic that is naturally produced by a harmless bacteria strain. This drug not only improves feed efficiency but also reduces the amount of methane gas emitted from the animal and its manure.

In addition to medicine, specific manure management techniques have been developed to counteract emissions from livestock manure. Educational resources have begun to be provided for small farms. Management techniques include daily pickup and storage of manure in a completely closed off storage facility that will prevent runoff from making it into bodies of water. The manure can then be kept in storage until it is either reused for fertilizer or taken away and stored in an offsite compost. Nutrient levels of various animal manures are provided for optimal use as compost for gardens and agriculture.

=== Landfills ===
To counteract methane emissions from landfills, on March 12, 1996, the EPA (Environmental Protection Agency) added the "Landfill Rule" to the Clean Air Act. This rule requires large landfills that have ever accepted municipal solid waste, have been used as of November 8, 1987, can hold at least 2.5 million metric tons of waste with a volume greater than 2.5 million cubic meters, and/or have nonmethane organic compound (NMOC) emissions of at least 50 metric tons per year to collect and combust emitted landfill gas. This set of requirements excludes 96% of the landfills in the U.S. While the direct result of this is landfills reducing emission of non-methane compounds that form smog, the indirect result is reduction of methane emissions as well.

In an attempt to absorb the methane that is already being produced from landfills, experiments in which nutrients were added to the soil to allow methanotrophs to thrive have been conducted. These nutrient supplemented landfills have been shown to act as a small scale methane sink, allowing the abundance of methanotrophs to sponge the methane from the air to use as energy, effectively reducing the landfill's emissions.

== See also ==
- Arctic methane emissions – Release of methane in the Arctic
- Climate change feedback – Feedback related to climate change
- Greenhouse gas emissions – Greenhouse gases emitted from human activities
- Greenhouse Gases Observing Satellite-2 – Japanese Earth observation satellite
- Global Methane Initiative – International partnership to reduce methane emissions
- Fugitive gas emissions – Type of pollution from oil and natural gas drilling and coal mining
- Food and Agriculture Organization Corporate Statistical Database – FAOSTAT statistical database (Food and Agriculture Organization of the United Nations)
