= Grenzebach BSH =

Grenzebach BSH GmbH
- Company type: GmbH
- Industry: Chemicals
- Founded: 2002
- Headquarters: Bad Hersfeld, Germany
- Key people: Robert Brier (CEO)
- Products: Specialty chemicals, synthetic rubber, plastics, intermediates
- Revenue: €108.9 million (2007)
- Number of employees: 350 (2013)
- Website: www.grenzebach.com

Grenzebach BSH (GmbH) was established following the take-over of Babcock-BSH GmbH by Grenzebach Maschinenbau GmbH. Grenzebach BSH GmbH has its registered office in Bad Hersfeld, Germany, and has been a member of the Grenzebach group since October 2002. The company employs some 350 people and at the Bad Hersfeld location continues its predecessor's activities as a supplier of equipment and services for the wood processing and building materials industries as well as the process technology sector. Its offices and workshops were first located in buildings that in part dated back to the old Schilde AG. Beginning in the summer of 2007, engineering and administration were the first departments to move into a new office building located at Gewerbepark Hohe Luft, a business park at the periphery of Bad Hersfeld. Construction of a new factory building right next to the offices began in 2008 and was completed in 2009. Manufacturing and the remaining departments such as R&D and logistics then also moved in from mid-2009. By the end of 2009 all buildings on the former Schilde premises in the town centre were vacated and handed back their owner, the town of Bad Hersfeld.

== Products ==
The company supplies equipment and systems for the production of bagged plaster, gypsum plasterboard, gypsum fibreboard, gypsum blocks, cement fibreboards and construction boards and panels. Its range of supplies and services for the wood processing industry includes veneer slicers, belt dryers, roller dryers, press dryers and veneer scanners. The mechanical process engineering department supplies pneumatic mixers, plants for the production of cellulose insulation materials, pigment plants, vibration tube mills, jet airstream sifters (cross flow sifters), powder compactors and whirlwind mills. The thermal process engineering range includes sectional coolers, moving bed coolers, recuperative multi-tube coolers and plants for the production of sodium triphosphate, calcined petroleum coke and cristobalite.
