= Grenzebach =

Grenzebach may stand for:

- Grenzebach (Schwalm), a river in Hesse, Germany, tributary of the Schwalm
- Obergrenzebach, a part of the community Frielendorf, Hesse, Germany
- Grenzebach BSH, a German company in the sector of wood processing, building materials and process technology
