= Cellulose insulating material plant =

Cellulose insulating material plants are used for the production of a natural building insulation material known as cellulose insulation.

== Assembly ==
Cellulose insulating material plants essentially exist of a feeding unit with primary reduction of the raw material, a dosing system for adding flame retarding agent, a defibration unit, a dedusting unit and the packaging unit.

== Function ==
The raw material is given loose or in bales into the primary reduction unit (for example a shredder). After this reduction, the flame retardant is added. The core of the cellulose insulating material plant is a Whirlwind Mill. This mill is able to fray out the material, what leads to fluffy, optimally defibrated flocks that contain only very small amounts of dust. Furthermore the flame retardant is stuck to the flocks during the defibration process. After the mill the material is conveyed pneumatically to the dedusting unit, where the dusty air and the cellulose fibers get separated. The finished fibers come to the packaging station, where they will be weight and packaged.

== Applications ==
Cellulose insulating material plants are used for the production of naturally insulating material out of raw material like newspapers, hemp, field grass and so forth. The insulating materials which are produced with this systems, are characterized by low energy input during the production compared to the conventional insulating materials such as mineral wool etc.
