= Greenhouse gas emissions =

Greenhouse gases emitted from human activities

Greenhouse gas emissions per person in the highest-emitting countries (as of 2023). Areas of rectangles represent total emissions for each country.

Greenhouse gas emissions (GHG emissions) from human activities intensify the greenhouse effect which contributes to climate change. Carbon dioxide (CO_{2}) from burning fossil fuels (such as coal, oil, and natural gas) is the main cause of climate change. The largest annual emissions are from China followed by the United States, which has higher emissions per capita. Emissions from human activities have increased atmospheric carbon dioxide by about 50% over pre-industrial levels. The growing levels of emissions have varied, but have been consistent among all greenhouse gases. Over 60 billion tons were emitted in 2025, higher than any year before. Total cumulative emissions from 1870 to 2022 were 703 GtC (2575 GtCO_{2}), of which 484±20 GtC (1773±73 GtCO_{2}) from fossil fuels and industry, and 219±60 GtC (802±220 GtCO_{2}) from land use change. Land-use change, such as deforestation, caused about 31% of cumulative emissions over 1870–2022, coal 32%, oil 24%, and gas 10%.

Carbon dioxide is the main greenhouse gas resulting from human activities. It accounts for more than half of warming. Methane (CH_{4}) emissions have almost the same short-term impact. Nitrous oxide (N_{2}O) and fluorinated gases (F-gases) play a lesser role in comparison. Emissions of carbon dioxide, methane and nitrous oxide in 2023 were all higher than ever before.

Electricity generation, heat and transport are major emitters; overall energy is responsible for around 73% of emissions. A growing concern for electricity usage is the expansion of artificial intelligence (AI), which is projected to significantly increase global energy demand. Deforestation and other changes in land use also emit carbon dioxide and methane. The largest source of anthropogenic methane emissions is agriculture, closely followed by gas venting and fugitive emissions from the fossil-fuel industry. The largest agricultural methane source is livestock. Agricultural soils emit nitrous oxide partly due to fertilizers. Similarly, fluorinated gases from refrigerants play an outsized role in total human emissions.

The current CO_{2}-equivalent emission rates, averaging 4.9 tonnes per person per year, are well over twice the estimated rate of 2.3 tons required to stay within the 2030 Paris Agreement increase of 1.5 °C (2.7 °F) over pre-industrial levels. Annual per capita emissions in the industrialized countries are typically as much as ten times the average in developing countries.

The carbon footprint (or greenhouse gas footprint) serves as an indicator to compare the amount of greenhouse gases emitted over the entire life cycle from the production of a good or service along the supply chain to its final consumption. Carbon accounting (or greenhouse gas accounting) is a framework of methods to measure and track how much greenhouse gas an organization emits. This accounting is used to help understand the various effects of emissions on positive and negative impacts they have on the climate including on human mortality.

== Relevance for greenhouse effect and global warming ==
The greenhouse effect occurs when heat-trapping gases in a planet's atmosphere prevent the planet from losing heat to space, raising its surface temperature. Surface heating can happen from an internal heat source (as in the case of Jupiter) or come from an external source, such as a host star. In the case of Earth, the Sun emits shortwave radiation (sunlight) that passes through greenhouse gases to heat the Earth's surface. In response, the Earth's surface emits longwave radiation that is mostly absorbed by greenhouse gases, reducing the rate at which the Earth can cool off.

Without the greenhouse effect, the Earth's average surface temperature would be as cold as −18 °C (−0.4 °F). This is much less than the 20th century average of about 14 °C (57 °F). In addition to naturally present greenhouse gases, burning of fossil fuels has increased amounts of carbon dioxide and methane in the atmosphere. As a result, at 2023, global warming of about 1.2 °C (2.2 °F) has occurred since the Industrial Revolution, with the global average surface temperature increasing at a rate of 0.18 °C (0.32 °F) per decade since 1981.

== Overview of main sources ==
=== Relevant greenhouse gases ===
The major anthropogenic (human origin) sources of greenhouse gases are carbon dioxide (CO_{2}), nitrous oxide (N_{2}O), methane and three groups of fluorinated gases (sulfur hexafluoride (SF_{6}), hydrofluorocarbons (HFCs) and perfluorocarbons (PFCs, sulphur hexafluoride (SF_{6}), and nitrogen trifluoride (NF_{3})). Though the greenhouse effect is heavily driven by water vapor, human emissions of water vapor are not a significant contributor to warming.

Although CFCs are greenhouse gases, they are regulated by the Montreal Protocol which was motivated by CFCs' contribution to ozone depletion rather than by their contribution to global warming. Ozone depletion has only a minor role in greenhouse warming, though the two processes are sometimes confused in the media. In 2016, negotiators from over 170 nations meeting at the summit of the United Nations Environment Programme reached a legally binding accord to phase out hydrofluorocarbons (HFCs) in the Kigali Amendment to the Montreal Protocol. The use of CFC-12 (except some essential uses) has been phased out due to its ozone depleting properties. The phasing-out of less active HCFC-compounds will be completed in 2030.

=== Human activities ===
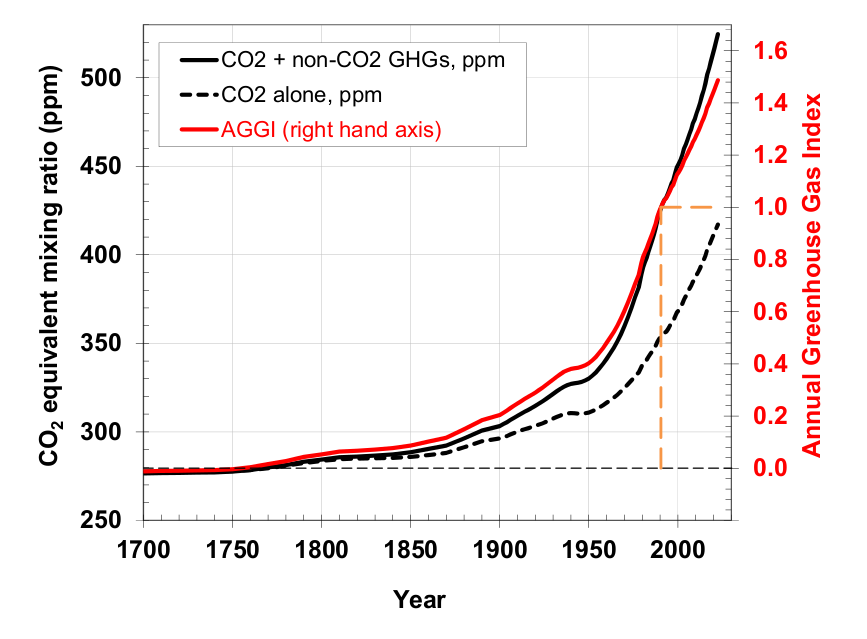
The industrial era growth in atmospheric CO_{2}-equivalent gas concentrations since 1750

Starting about 1750, industrial activity powered by fossil fuels began to significantly increase the concentration of carbon dioxide and other greenhouse gases. Emissions have grown rapidly since about 1950 with ongoing expansions in global population and economic activity following World War II. As of 2021, measured atmospheric concentrations of carbon dioxide were almost 50% higher than pre-industrial levels.

The main sources of greenhouse gases due to human activity (also called carbon sources) are:

- Burning fossil fuels: Burning oil, coal and gas is estimated to have emitted 37.4 billion tonnes of CO_{2}-eq in 2023. The largest single source is coal-fired power stations, with 20% of greenhouse gases (GHG) as of 2021.
- Land use change (mainly deforestation in the tropics) accounts for about a quarter of total anthropogenic GHG emissions.
- Livestock enteric fermentation and manure management, paddy rice farming, land use and wetland changes, human-made lakes, pipeline losses, and covered vented landfill emissions leading to higher methane atmospheric concentrations. Many of the newer style fully vented septic systems that enhance and target the fermentation process also are sources of atmospheric methane.
- Use of chlorofluorocarbons (CFCs) in refrigeration systems, and use of CFCs and halons in fire suppression systems and manufacturing processes.
- Agricultural soils emit nitrous oxide (N_{2}O) partly due to application of fertilizers.
- The largest source of anthropogenic methane emissions is agriculture, closely followed by gas venting and fugitive emissions from the fossil-fuel industry. The largest agricultural methane source is livestock. Cattle (raised for both beef and milk, as well as for inedible outputs like manure and draft power) are the animal species responsible for the most emissions, representing about 65% of the livestock sector's emissions.

=== Global estimates ===
Per capita CO_{2} emissions surged after the mid-20th century, but then slowed their rate of growth.

Global greenhouse gas emissions are about 50 Gt per year, and for 2024 have been estimated at 57.7 Gt CO_{2eq}. The largest contributor of total GHG emissions came from the power sector at approximately 27%, followed by transport at 15%, while industrial energy and agriculture each contributed 11%.

The current CO_{2}-equivalent emission rates averaging 4.9 tonnes per person per year, are over twice the estimated rate 2.3 tons required to stay within the 2030 Paris Agreement increase of 1.5 °C (2.7 °F) over pre-industrial levels.

While cities are sometimes considered to be disproportionate contributors to emissions, per-capita emissions tend to be lower for cities than the averages in their countries.

A 2017 survey of corporations responsible for global emissions found that 100 companies were responsible for 71% of global direct and indirect emissions, and that state-owned companies were responsible for 59% of their emissions.

China is, by a significant margin, Asia's and the world's largest emitter; it emits around 10 billion tonnes each year, more than one-quarter of global emissions. Other countries with fast growing emissions are United States, India, Russia, and Indonesia. Among these top emitters, in 2024, China, India, Russia and Indonesia increased their emissions compared to 2023, with Indonesia having the largest increase in relative terms, and India the largest absolute increase by 164.8 Mt CO_{2eq}. Conversely, EU-27 GHG emissions, excluding LULUCF, were approximately 35% lower than in 1990 reaching 3.2 Gt CO_{2eq}.

2015 was the first year to see both total global economic growth and a reduction of carbon emissions.

=== High income countries compared to low income countries ===
Scaling the effect of wealth to the national level: richer (developed) countries emit more CO_{2} per person than poorer (developing) countries. Emissions are roughly proportional to GDP per person, though the rate of increase diminishes with average GDP/pp of about $10,000.

Annual per capita emissions in the industrialized countries are typically as much as ten times the average in developing countries. Due to China's fast economic development, its annual per capita emissions are quickly approaching the levels of those in the Annex I group of the Kyoto Protocol (i.e., the developed countries excluding the US).

Africa and South America are both fairly small emitters, accounting for 3–4% of global emissions each. Both have emissions almost equal to international aviation and shipping.

== Calculations and reporting ==
=== Variables ===
There are several ways of measuring greenhouse gas emissions. Some variables that have been reported include:

- Definition of measurement boundaries: Emissions can be attributed geographically, to the area where they were emitted (the territory principle) or by the activity principle to the territory that produced the emissions. These two principles result in different totals when measuring, for example, electricity importation from one country to another, or emissions at an international airport.
- Time horizon of different gases: The contribution of given greenhouse gas is reported as a CO_{2} equivalent. The calculation to determine this takes into account how long that gas remains in the atmosphere. This is not always known accurately and calculations must be regularly updated to reflect new information.
- The measurement protocol itself: This may be via direct measurement or estimation. The four main methods are the emission factor-based method, mass balance method, predictive emissions monitoring systems, and continuous emissions monitoring systems. These methods differ in accuracy, cost, and usability. Public information from space-based measurements of carbon dioxide by Climate Trace is expected to reveal individual large plants before the 2021 United Nations Climate Change Conference.

These measures are sometimes used by countries to assert various policy/ethical positions on climate change.The use of different measures leads to a lack of comparability, which is problematic when monitoring progress towards targets. There are arguments for the adoption of a common measurement tool, or at least the development of communication between different tools.

=== Reporting ===
Emissions may be tracked over long time periods, known as historical or cumulative emissions measurements. Cumulative emissions provide some indicators of what is responsible for greenhouse gas atmospheric concentration build-up.

=== National accounts balance ===
Substantial land-use change contributions to emissions have been made by Latin America, Southeast Asia, Africa, and Pacific Islands. Area of rectangles shows total emissions in 2019 for that region.

The national accounts balance tracks emissions based on the difference between a country's exports and imports. For many richer nations, the balance is negative because more goods are imported than they are exported. This result is mostly due to the fact that it is cheaper to produce goods outside of developed countries, leading developed countries to become increasingly dependent on services and not goods. A positive account balance would mean that more production was occurring within a country, so more operational factories would increase carbon emission levels.

Emissions may also be measured across shorter time periods. Emissions changes may, for example, be measured against the base year of 1990. 1990 was used in the United Nations Framework Convention on Climate Change (UNFCCC) as the base year for emissions, and is also used in the Kyoto Protocol (some gases are also measured from the year 1995). A country's emissions may also be reported as a proportion of global emissions for a particular year.

Another measurement is of per capita emissions. This divides a country's total annual emissions by its mid-year population. Per capita emissions may be based on historical or annual emissions.

=== Embedded emissions ===
One way of attributing greenhouse gas emissions is to measure the embedded emissions (also referred to as "embodied emissions") of goods that are being consumed. Emissions are usually measured according to production, rather than consumption. For example, in the main international treaty on climate change (the UNFCCC), countries report on emissions produced within their borders, e.g. the emissions produced from burning fossil fuels. Under a production-based accounting of emissions, embedded emissions on imported goods are attributed to the exporting, rather than the importing, country. Under a consumption-based accounting of emissions, embedded emissions on imported goods are attributed to the importing country, rather than the exporting, country.

A substantial proportion of CO_{2} emissions is traded internationally. The net effect of trade was to export emissions from China and other emerging markets to consumers in the US, Japan, and Western Europe.

=== Carbon footprint ===
A carbon footprint (or greenhouse gas footprint) is a calculated value or index that allows the comparison of the total amount of greenhouse gases that an activity, product, company or country adds to the atmosphere.

An organization's carbon footprint includes the direct and indirect emissions it causes. The Greenhouse Gas Protocol (for carbon accounting of organizations) calls these Scope 1, 2 and 3 emissions. There are several methodologies and online tools to calculate the carbon footprint. They depend on whether the focus is on a country, organization, product or individual person. For example, the carbon footprint of a product could help consumers decide which product to buy if they want to be climate aware. For climate change mitigation activities, the carbon footprint can help distinguish those economic activities with a high footprint from those with a low footprint. So the carbon footprint concept allows everyone to make comparisons between the climate impacts of individuals, products, companies and countries. It also helps people devise strategies and priorities for reducing the carbon footprint.

For countries, it is common to use consumption-based emissions accounting to calculate their carbon footprint for a given year. Consumption-based accounting using input-output analysis backed by super-computing makes it possible to analyze global supply chains. Countries also prepare national GHG inventories for the UNFCCC. The GHG emissions listed in those national inventories are only from activities in the country itself. This approach is called territorial-based accounting or production-based accounting. It does not take into account production of goods and services imported on behalf of residents. Consumption-based accounting does reflect emissions from goods and services imported from other countries.

Consumption-based accounting is therefore more comprehensive. This comprehensive carbon footprint reporting including Scope 3 emissions deals with gaps in current systems. Countries' GHG inventories for the UNFCCC do not include international transport. Comprehensive carbon footprint reporting looks at the final demand for emissions, to where the consumption of the goods and services takes place.For organizations it is common practice to use the Greenhouse Gas Protocol.

=== Emission intensity ===
Emission intensity is a ratio between greenhouse gas emissions and another metric, e.g., gross domestic product (GDP) or energy use. The terms "carbon intensity" and "emissions intensity" are also sometimes used. Emission intensities may be calculated using market exchange rates (MER) or purchasing power parity (PPP).

=== Example tools and websites ===
Carbon accounting (or greenhouse gas accounting) is a framework of methods to measure and track how much greenhouse gas an organization emits.

==== Climate TRACE ====
Climate TRACE (Tracking Real-Time Atmospheric Carbon Emissions) is an independent group which monitors and publishes greenhouse gas emissions. It launched in 2021 before COP26, and improves monitoring, reporting and verification (MRV) of both carbon dioxide and methane. The group monitors sources such as coal mines and power station smokestacks worldwide, with satellite data (but not their own satellites) and artificial intelligence.

== Historical trends ==
=== Cumulative and historical emissions ===
Cumulative and annual CO_{2} emissions

Cumulatively, the U.S. has emitted the greatest amount of CO_{2}, though China's emission trend is now steeper.

Annually, the U.S. emitted the most CO_{2} until early in the 21st century, when China's annual emissions began to dominate.

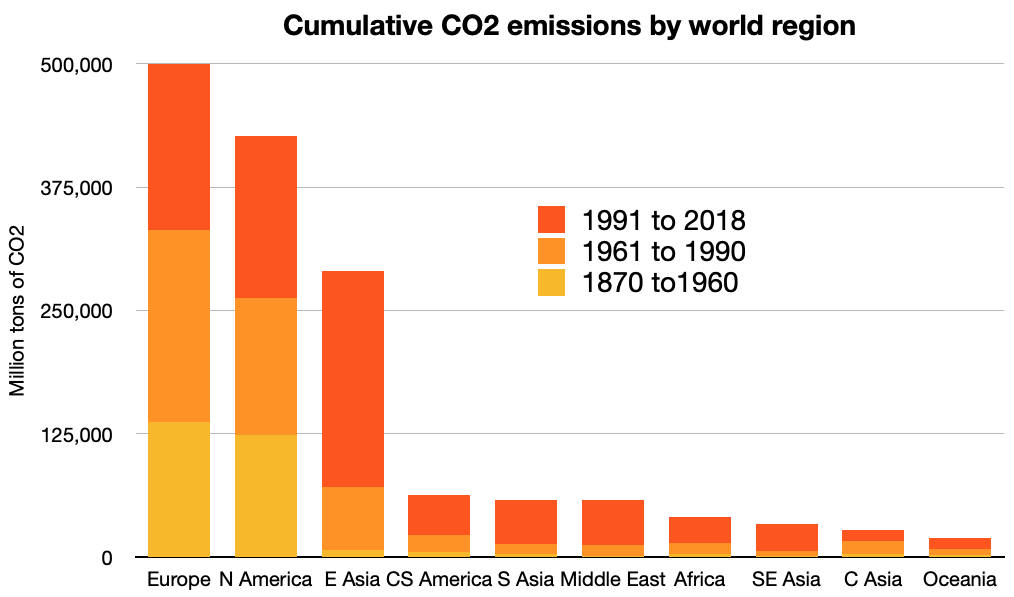
Cumulative CO_{2} emission by world region

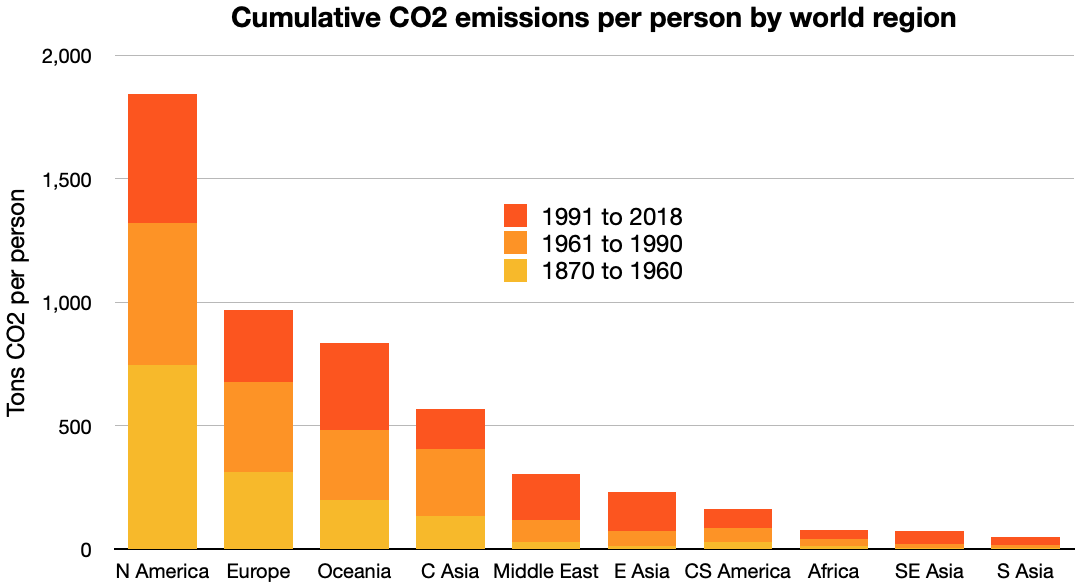
Cumulative per person emissions by world region in 3 time periods

Emissions of carbon dioxide into the atmosphere, by source

Cumulative anthropogenic (i.e., human-emitted) emissions of CO_{2} from fossil fuel use are a major cause of global warming, and give some indication of which countries have contributed most to human-induced climate change. In particular, CO_{2} stays in the atmosphere for at least 150 years and up to 1000 years, whilst methane disappears within a decade or so, and nitrous oxides last about 100 years. The graph gives some indication of which regions have contributed most to human-induced climate change. When these numbers are calculated per capita cumulative emissions based on then-current population the situation is shown even more clearly. The ratio in per capita emissions between industrialized countries and developing countries was estimated at more than 10 to 1.

Non-OECD countries accounted for 42% of cumulative energy-related CO_{2} emissions between 1890 and 2007. Over this time period, the US accounted for 28% of emissions; the EU, 23%; Japan, 4%; other OECD countries 5%; Russia, 11%; China, 9%; India, 3%; and the rest of the world, 18%.The European Commission adopted a set of legislative proposals targeting a reduction of the CO_{2} emissions by 55% by 2030.

Overall, developed countries accounted for 83.8% of industrial CO_{2} emissions over this time period, and 67.8% of total CO_{2} emissions. Developing countries accounted for industrial CO_{2} emissions of 16.2% over this time period, and 32.2% of total CO_{2} emissions.

However, what becomes clear when we look at emissions across the world today is that the countries with the highest emissions over history are not always the biggest emitters today. For example, in 2017, the UK accounted for just 1% of global emissions.

In comparison, humans have emitted more greenhouse gases than the Chicxulub meteorite impact event which caused the extinction of the dinosaurs.

Transport, together with electricity generation, is the major source of greenhouse gas emissions in the EU. Greenhouse gas emissions from the transportation sector continue to rise, in contrast to power generation and nearly all other sectors. Since 1990, transportation emissions have increased by 30%. The transportation sector accounts for around 70% of these emissions. The majority of these emissions are caused by passenger vehicles and vans. Road travel is the first major source of greenhouse gas emissions from transportation, followed by aircraft and maritime. Waterborne transportation is still the least carbon-intensive mode of transportation on average, and it is an essential link in sustainable multimodal freight supply chains.

Buildings, like industry, are directly responsible for around one-fifth of greenhouse gas emissions, primarily from space heating and hot water consumption. When combined with power consumption within buildings, this figure climbs to more than one-third.

Within the EU, the agricultural sector presently accounts for roughly 10% of total greenhouse gas emissions, with methane from livestock accounting for slightly more than half of 10%.

Estimates of total CO_{2} emissions do include biotic carbon emissions, mainly from deforestation. Including biotic emissions brings about the same controversy mentioned earlier regarding carbon sinks and land-use change. The actual calculation of net emissions is very complex, and is affected by how carbon sinks are allocated between regions and the dynamics of the climate system.

=== Changes since a particular base year ===
The sharp acceleration in CO_{2} emissions since 2000 to more than a 3% increase per year (more than 2 ppm per year) from 1.1% per year during the 1990s is attributable to the lapse of formerly declining trends in carbon intensity of both developing and developed nations. China was responsible for most of global growth in emissions during this period. Localised plummeting emissions associated with the collapse of the Soviet Union have been followed by slow emissions growth in this region due to more efficient energy use, made necessary by the increasing proportion of it that is exported. In comparison, methane has not increased appreciably, and N_{2}O by 0.25% y^{−1}.

Using different base years for measuring emissions has an effect on estimates of national contributions to global warming. This can be calculated by dividing a country's highest contribution to global warming starting from a particular base year, by that country's minimum contribution to global warming starting from a particular base year. Choosing between base years of 1750, 1900, 1950, and 1990 has a significant effect for most countries.

=== Data from Global Carbon Project ===
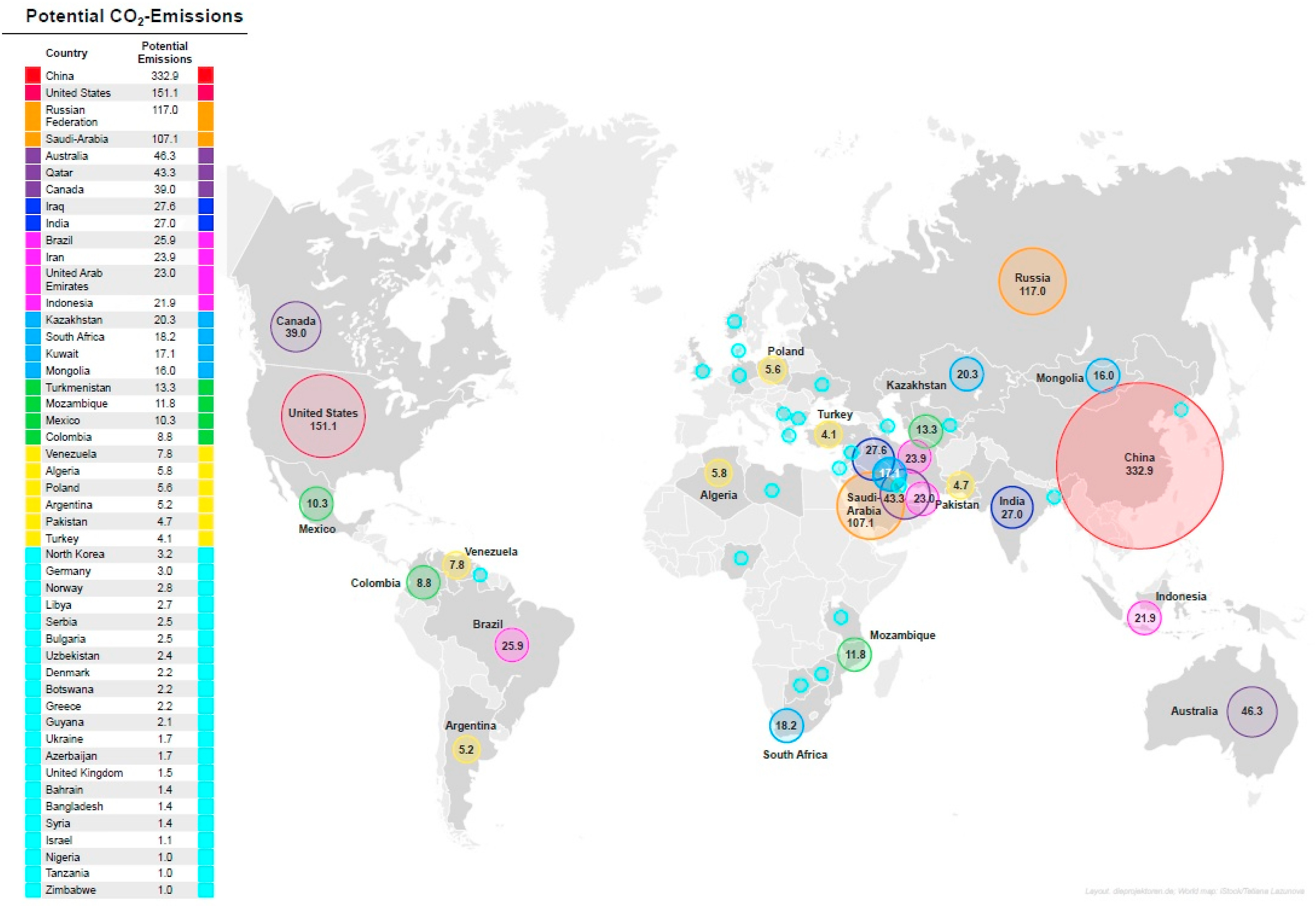
Map of key fossil fuel projects ("carbon bombs"): proposed or existing fossil fuel extraction projects (a coal mine, oil or gas project) that would result in more than 1 gigaton of CO_{2} emissions if its reserves were completely extracted and burnt.

The Global Carbon Project continuously releases data about CO_{2} emissions, budget and concentration.

CO_{2} emissions
| Year | Fossil fuels and industry (excluding cement carbonation) Gt C | Land use change Gt C | Total Gt C | Total Gt CO_{2} |
|---|---|---|---|---|
| 2010 | 9.106 | 1.32 | 10.43 | 38.0 |
| 2011 | 9.412 | 1.35 | 10.76 | 39.2 |
| 2012 | 9.554 | 1.32 | 10.87 | 39.6 |
| 2013 | 9.640 | 1.26 | 10.9 | 39.7 |
| 2014 | 9.710 | 1.34 | 11.05 | 40.2 |
| 2015 | 9.704 | 1.47 | 11.17 | 40.7 |
| 2016 | 9.695 | 1.24 | 10.93 | 39.8 |
| 2017 | 9.852 | 1.18 | 11.03 | 40.2 |
| 2018 | 10.051 | 1.14 | 11.19 | 40.7 |
| 2019 | 10.120 | 1.24 | 11.36 | 41.3 |
| 2020 | 9.624 | 1.11 | 10.73 | 39.1 |
| 2021 | 10.132 | 1.08 | 11.21 | 40.8 |
| 2022 (projection) | 10.2 | 1.08 | 11.28 | 41.3 |

== Emissions by type of greenhouse gas ==
Distribution of global greenhouse gas emissions based on type of greenhouse gas, without land-use change, using 100 year global warming potential (data from 2020).
Total: 49.8 GtCO_{2}e
1. CO_{2} mostly by fossil fuel (72.0%)
2. CH_{4} methane (19.0%)
3. N_{2}O nitrous oxide (6.00%)
4. Fluorinated gases (3.00%)

Carbon dioxide (CO_{2}) is the dominant emitted greenhouse gas, while methane (CH_{4}) emissions almost have the same short-term impact. Nitrous oxide (N_{2}O) and fluorinated gases (F-gases) play a lesser role in comparison.

Greenhouse gas emissions are measured in CO_{2} equivalents determined by their global warming potential (GWP), which depends on their lifetime in the atmosphere. Estimations largely depend on the ability of oceans and land sinks to absorb these gases. Short-lived climate pollutants (SLCPs) including methane, hydrofluorocarbons (HFCs), tropospheric ozone and black carbon persist in the atmosphere for a period ranging from days to 15 years; whereas carbon dioxide can remain in the atmosphere for millennia. Reducing SLCP emissions can cut the ongoing rate of global warming by almost half and reduce the projected Arctic warming by two-thirds.

Greenhouse gas emissions in 2019 were estimated at 57.4 GtCO_{2}e, while CO_{2} emissions alone made up 42.5 Gt including land-use change (LUC).

While mitigation measures for decarbonization are essential on the longer term, they could result in weak near-term warming because sources of carbon emissions often also co-emit air pollution. Hence, pairing measures that target carbon dioxide with measures targeting non-CO_{2} pollutants – short-lived climate pollutants, which have faster effects on the climate, is essential for climate goals.

=== Carbon dioxide (CO_{2}) ===
- Fossil fuel (use for energy generation, transport, heating and machinery in industrial plants): oil, gas and coal (89%) are the major driver of anthropogenic global warming with annual emissions of 35.6 GtCO_{2} in 2019.
- Cement production (burning of fossil fuels) (4%) is estimated at 1.42 GtCO_{2}
- Land-use change (LUC) is the imbalance of deforestation and reforestation. Estimations are very uncertain at 4.5 GtCO_{2}. Wildfires alone cause annual emissions of about 7 GtCO_{2}
- Non-energy use of fuels, carbon losses in coke ovens, and flaring in crude oil production.

=== Methane (CH_{4}) ===
Methane emissions from fossil fuels, industrial and agricultural practices have increased since the industrial revolution.

Methane has a high immediate impact with a 5-year global warming potential of up to 100. Given this, the current 389 Mt of methane emissions has about the same short-term global warming effect as CO_{2} emissions, with a risk to trigger irreversible changes in climate and ecosystems. For methane, a reduction of about 30% below current emission levels would lead to a stabilization in its atmospheric concentration.

- Fossil fuels (32%) (emissions due to losses during production and transport) account for most of the methane emissions including coal mining (12% of methane total), gas distribution and leakages (11%) as well as gas venting in oil production (9%).
- Livestock (28%) with cattle (21%) as the dominant source, followed by buffalo (3%), sheep (2%), and goats (1.5%).
- Human waste and wastewater (21%): When biomass waste in landfills and organic substances in domestic and industrial wastewater is decomposed by bacteria in anaerobic conditions, substantial amounts of methane are generated.
- Rice cultivation (10%) on flooded rice fields is another agricultural source, where anaerobic decomposition of organic material produces methane.

=== Nitrous oxide (N_{2}O) ===
N_{2}O has a high GWP and significant Ozone Depleting Potential. It is estimated that the global warming potential of N_{2}O over 100 years is 265 times greater than CO_{2}. For N_{2}O, a reduction of more than 50% would be required for a stabilization.

Most emissions (56%) of nitrous oxide comes from agriculture, especially meat production: cattle (droppings on pasture), fertilizers, animal manure.Further contributions come from combustion of fossil fuels (18%) and biofuels as well as industrial production of adipic acid and nitric acid.

=== F-gases ===
Fluorinated gases include hydrofluorocarbons (HFC), perfluorocarbons (PFC), sulfur hexafluoride (SF_{6}), and nitrogen trifluoride (NF_{3}). They are used by switchgear in the power sector, semiconductor manufacture, aluminum production and a largely unknown source of SF_{6}. Continued phase down of manufacture and use of HFCs under the Kigali Amendment to the Montreal Protocol will help reduce HFC emissions and concurrently improve the energy efficiency of appliances that use HFCs like air conditioners, freezers and other refrigeration devices.

=== Hydrogen ===
Hydrogen leakages contribute to indirect global warming. When hydrogen is oxidized in the atmosphere, the result is an increase in concentrations of greenhouse gases in both the troposphere and the stratosphere. Hydrogen can leak from hydrogen production facilities as well as any infrastructure in which hydrogen is transported, stored, or consumed.

=== Black carbon ===
Black carbon is formed through the incomplete combustion of fossil fuels, biofuel, and biomass. It is not a greenhouse gas but a climate forcing agent. Black carbon can absorb sunlight and reduce albedo when deposited on snow and ice. Indirect heating can be caused by the interaction with clouds. Black carbon stays in the atmosphere for only several days to weeks. Emissions may be mitigated by upgrading coke ovens, installing particulate filters on diesel-based engines, reducing routine flaring, and minimizing open burning of biomass.

== Emissions by sector ==
Contributions to climate change broken down by economic sector as of 2019

Global greenhouse gas emissions can be attributed to different sectors of the economy. This provides a picture of the varying contributions of different types of economic activity to climate change, and helps in understanding the changes required to mitigate climate change.

Greenhouse gas emissions can be divided into those that arise from the combustion of fuels to produce energy, and those generated by other processes. Around two thirds of greenhouse gas emissions arise from the combustion of fuels.

Energy may be produced at the point of consumption, or by a generator for consumption by others. Thus emissions arising from energy production may be categorized according to where they are emitted, or where the resulting energy is consumed. If emissions are attributed at the point of production, then electricity generators contribute about 25% of global greenhouse gas emissions. If these emissions are attributed to the final consumer then 24% of total emissions arise from manufacturing and construction, 17% from transportation, 11% from domestic consumers, and 7% from commercial consumers. Around 4% of emissions arise from the energy consumed by the energy and fuel industry itself.

The remaining third of emissions arise from processes other than energy production. 12% of total emissions arise from agriculture, 7% from land use change and forestry, 6% from industrial processes, and 3% from waste.

=== Electricity generation ===
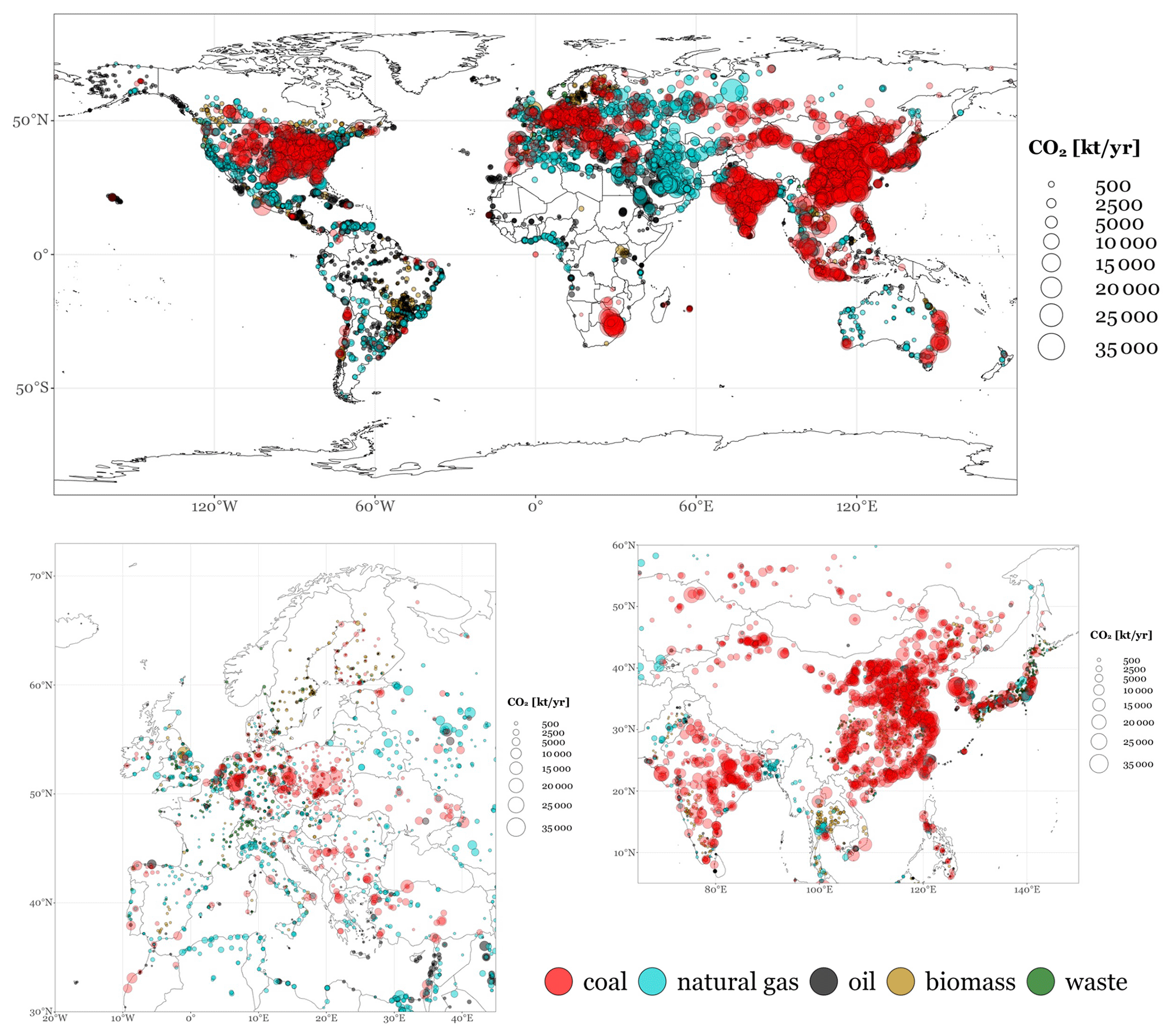
Emissions attributed to specific power stations around the world, color-coded by type of fuel used at the station. Lower half focuses on Europe and Asia

Coal-fired power stations are the single largest emitter, with over 20% of global greenhouse gas emissions in 2018. Although much less polluting than coal plants, natural gas-fired power plants are also major emitters, taking electricity generation as a whole over 25% in 2018. Notably, just 5% of the world's power plants account for almost three-quarters of carbon emissions from electricity generation, based on an inventory of more than 29,000 fossil-fuel power plants across 221 countries. In the 2022 IPCC report, it is noted that providing modern energy services universally would only increase greenhouse gas emissions by a few percent at most. This slight increase means that the additional energy demand that comes from supporting decent living standards for all would be far lower than current average energy consumption.

In March 2024, the International Energy Agency (IEA) reported that in 2023, global CO_{2} emissions from energy sources increased by 1.1%, rising by 410 million tonnes to a record 37.4 billion tonnes, primarily due to coal. Drought-related decreases in hydropower contributed to a 170 million tonne rise in emissions, which would have otherwise led to a decrease in the electricity sector's emissions. The implementation of clean energy technologies like solar, wind, nuclear, heat pumps, and electric vehicles since 2019 has significantly tempered emissions growth, which would have been threefold without these technologies.

=== Agriculture, forestry and land use ===
==== Agriculture ====
Greenhouse gas emissions from agriculture are large: the agriculture, forestry and land use sectors contribute between 13% and 21% of global greenhouse gas emissions. Direct greenhouse gas emissions include those from rice and livestock farming. Indirect emissions from the conversion of non-agricultural land such as forests into agricultural land are also very important. With regard to direct emissions, nitrous oxide and methane make up over half of total greenhouse gas emissions from agriculture. A 2023 review emphasizes that emissions from agricultural soils are shaped by factors such as soil type, climate, and management practices. It also highlights several mitigation strategies, including conservation tillage, precision agriculture, improved water use, and the application of biochar, that can reduce emissions and enhance soil carbon storage.

Furthermore, there is also fossil fuel consumption for transport and fertilizer production. For example, the manufacture and use of nitrogen fertilizer contribute around 5% of all global greenhouse gas emissions. Livestock farming is a major source of greenhouse gas emissions.

Farm animals' digestive systems can be put into two categories: monogastric and ruminant. Ruminant cattle for beef and dairy rank high in greenhouse gas emissions. In comparison, monogastric, or pigs and poultry-related foods, are lower. The consumption of the monogastric types may yield fewer emissions. Monogastric animals have a higher feed-conversion efficiency and also do not produce as much methane. Non-ruminant livestock, such as poultry, emit much less greenhouse gas.

===== Deforestation =====
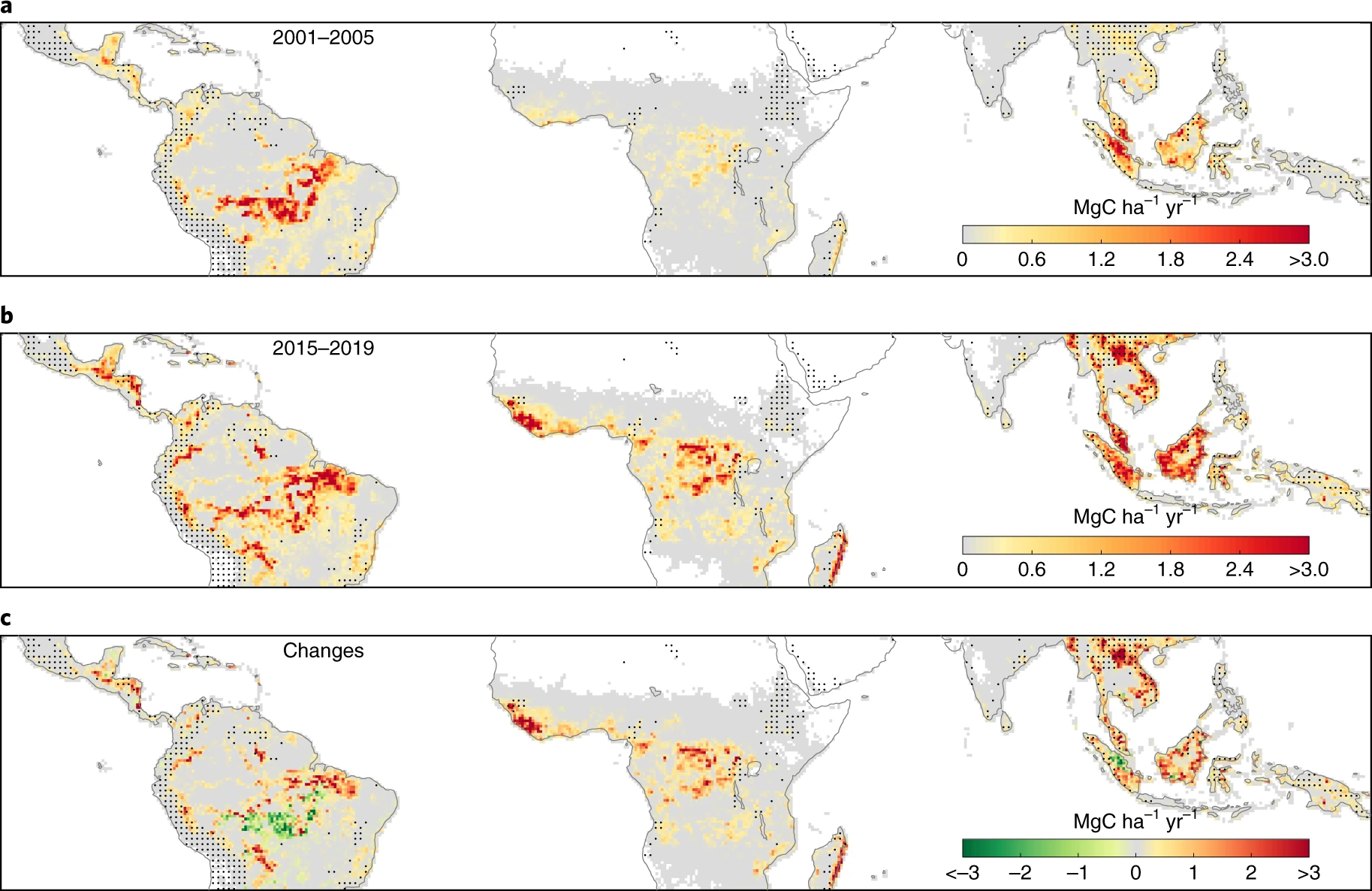
Mean annual carbon loss from tropical deforestation

Deforestation is a major source of greenhouse gas emissions. A study shows annual carbon emissions (or carbon loss) from tropical deforestation have doubled during the last two decades and continue to increase. (0.97 ±0.16 PgC per year in 2001–2005 to 1.99 ±0.13 PgC per year in 2015–2019)

===== Land-use change =====
Land-use change, e.g., the clearing of forests for agricultural use, can affect the concentration of greenhouse gases in the atmosphere by altering how much carbon flows out of the atmosphere into carbon sinks. Accounting for land-use change can be understood as an attempt to measure "net" emissions, i.e., gross emissions from all sources minus the removal of emissions from the atmosphere by carbon sinks.

There are substantial uncertainties in the measurement of net carbon emissions. Additionally, there is controversy over how carbon sinks should be allocated between different regions and over time. For instance, concentrating on more recent changes in carbon sinks is likely to favour those regions that have deforested earlier, e.g., Europe.

In 1997, human-caused Indonesian peat fires were estimated to have released between 13% and 40% of the average annual global carbon emissions caused by the burning of fossil fuels.

=== Transport of people and goods ===
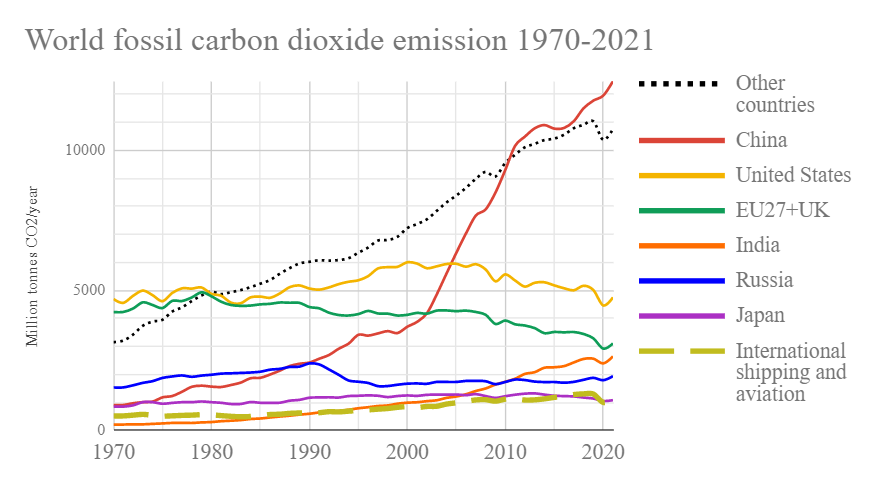
Aviation and shipping (dashed line) produce a significant proportion of global carbon dioxide emissions.

Transportation accounts for 15% of emissions worldwide. Over a quarter of global transport CO_{2} emissions are from road freight, so many countries are further restricting truck CO_{2} emissions to help limit climate change.

Maritime transport accounts for 3.5% to 4% of all greenhouse gas emissions, primarily carbon dioxide. In 2022, the shipping industry's 3% of global greenhouse gas emissions made it "the sixth largest greenhouse gas emitter worldwide, ranking between Japan and Germany."

==== Aviation ====
Jet airliners contribute to climate change by emitting carbon dioxide (CO_{2}), nitrogen oxides, contrails and particulates.In 2018, global commercial operations generated 2.4% of all CO_{2} emissions.

In 2020, approximately 3.5% of the overall human impacts on climate are from the aviation sector. The impact of the sector on climate in the last 20 years had doubled, but the part of the contribution of the sector in comparison to other sectors did not change because other sectors grew as well.

Some representative figures for CO_{2} average direct emissions (not accounting for high-altitude radiative effects) of airliners expressed as CO_{2} and CO_{2} equivalent per passenger kilometer:

- Domestic, short distance, less than 463 km (288 mi): 257 g/km CO_{2} or 259 g/km (14.7 oz/mile) CO_{2}e
- Long-distance flights: 113 g/km CO_{2} or 114 g/km (6.5 oz/mile) CO_{2}e

=== Buildings and construction ===
CO_{2} emissions by fuel type (as of 2023)
1. coal (41.0%)
2. oil (32.0%)
3. gas (21.0%)
4. cement (4.00%)
5. others (2.00%)

In 2018, manufacturing construction materials and maintaining buildings accounted for 39% of carbon dioxide emissions from energy and process-related emissions. Manufacture of glass, cement, and steel accounted for 11% of energy and process-related emissions. Because building construction is a significant investment, more than two-thirds of buildings in existence will still exist in 2050. Retrofitting existing buildings to become more efficient will be necessary to meet the targets of the Paris Agreement; it will be insufficient to only apply low-emission standards to new construction. Buildings that produce as much energy as they consume are called zero-energy buildings, while buildings that produce more than they consume are energy-plus. Low-energy buildings are designed to be highly efficient with low total energy consumption and carbon emissions—a popular type is the passive house.

The construction industry has seen marked advances in building performance and energy efficiency over recent decades. Green building practices that avoid emissions or capture the carbon already present in the environment, allow for reduced footprint of the construction industry, for example, use of hempcrete, cellulose fiber insulation, and landscaping.

According to a report by UNEP, the sector represents more than 35% of total global CO2 emissions. In 2019, the building sector was responsible for 12 GtCO_{2}-eq emissions. More than 95% of these emissions were carbon, and the remaining 5% were CH_{4}, N_{2}O, and halocarbon.

The largest contributor to building sector emissions (49% of total) is the production of electricity for use in buildings.

Of global building sector GHG emissions, 28% are produced during the manufacturing process of building materials such as steel, cement (a key component of concrete), and glass. The conventional process inherently related to the production of steel and cement results in large amounts of CO_{2} emitted. For example, the production of steel in 2018 was responsible for 7 to 9% of the global CO_{2} emissions.

The remaining 23% of global building sector GHG emissions are produced directly on site during building operations.

==== Embodied carbon emissions in construction sector ====
Embodied carbon emissions, or upfront carbon emissions (UCE), are the result of creating and maintaining the materials that form a building. As of 2018, "Embodied carbon is responsible 11% of global greenhouse gas emissions and 28% of global building sector emissions ... Embodied carbon will be responsible for almost half of total new construction emissions between now and 2050."

GHG emissions which are produced during the mining, processing, manufacturing, transportation and installation of building materials are referred to as the embodied carbon of a material. The embodied carbon of a construction project can be reduced by using low-carbon materials for building structures and finishes, reducing demolition, and reusing buildings and construction materials whenever possible.

=== Industrial processes ===
As of 2020 Secunda CTL is the world's largest single emitter, at 56.5 million tonnes CO_{2} a year.

==== Mining ====
Flaring and venting of natural gas in oil wells is a significant source of greenhouse gas emissions. Its contribution to greenhouse gases has declined by three-quarters in absolute terms since a peak in the 1970s of approximately 110 million metric tons/year, and in 2004 accounted for about 1/2 of one percent of all anthropogenic carbon dioxide emissions.

The World Bank estimates that 134 billion cubic meters of natural gas are flared or vented annually (2010 datum), an amount equivalent to the combined annual gas consumption of Germany and France or enough to supply the entire world with gas for 16 days. This flaring is highly concentrated: 10 countries account for 70% of emissions, and twenty for 85%.

==== Steel and aluminum ====
Steel and aluminum are key economic sectors where CO_{2} is produced. According to a 2013 study, "in 2004, the steel industry along emits about 590M tons of CO_{2}, which accounts for 5.2% of the global anthropogenic GHG emissions. CO_{2} emitted from steel production primarily comes from energy consumption of fossil fuel as well as the use of limestone to purify iron oxides."

More recent estimates suggest that global steel production emitted around 2,280 million tons of CO_{2} in 2017, indicating the scale has increased significantly. A 2022 study found that across bulk material sectors—steel, aluminum, cement, and paper—total emissions reached approximately 8.4 billion tons of CO_{2} equivalent.

==== Plastics ====
Plastics are produced mainly from fossil fuels. It was estimated that between 3% and 4% of global GHG emissions are associated with plastics' life cycles. The EPA estimates as many as five mass units of carbon dioxide are emitted for each mass unit of polyethylene terephthalate (PET) produced—the type of plastic most commonly used for beverage bottles, the transportation produce greenhouse gases also. Plastic waste emits carbon dioxide when it degrades. In 2018 research claimed that some of the most common plastics in the environment release the greenhouse gases methane and ethylene when exposed to sunlight in an amount that can affect the earth climate.

Due to the lightness of plastic versus glass or metal, plastic may reduce energy consumption. For example, packaging beverages in PET plastic rather than glass or metal is estimated to save 52% in transportation energy, if the glass or metal package is single-use, of course.

In 2019 a new report "Plastic and Climate" was published. According to the report, the production and incineration of plastics will contribute in the equivalent of 850 million tonnes of carbon dioxide (CO_{2}) to the atmosphere in 2019. With the current trend, annual life cycle greenhouse gas emissions of plastics will grow to 1.34 billion tonnes by 2030. By 2050, the life cycle emissions of plastics could reach 56 billion tonnes, as much as 14 percent of the Earth's remaining carbon budget. The report says that only solutions which involve a reduction in consumption can solve the problem, while others like biodegradable plastic, ocean cleanup, using renewable energy in plastic industry can do little, and in some cases may even worsen it.

==== Pulp and paper ====
The global print and paper industry accounts for about 1% of global carbon dioxide emissions. Greenhouse gas emissions from the pulp and paper industry are generated from the combustion of fossil fuels required for raw material production and transportation, wastewater treatment facilities, purchased power, paper transportation, printed product transportation, disposal and recycling.

=== Various services ===
==== Digital services ====
In 2020, data centers (excluding cryptocurrency mining) and data transmission each used about 1% of world electricity. The digital sector produces between 2% and 4% of global GHG emissions, a large part of which is from chipmaking. However the sector reduces emissions from other sectors which have a larger global share, such as transport of people, and possibly buildings and industry.

Mining for proof-of-work cryptocurrencies requires enormous amounts of electricity and consequently comes with a large carbon footprint. Proof-of-work blockchains such as Bitcoin, Ethereum, Litecoin, and Monero were estimated to have added between 3 million and 15 million tonnes of carbon dioxide (CO_{2}) to the atmosphere in the period from 1 January 2016 to 30 June 2017. By the end of 2021, Bitcoin was estimated to produce 65.4 million tonnes of CO_{2}, as much as Greece, and consume between 91 and 177 terawatt-hours annually (0.3% to 0.6% of world electricity). Bitcoin is the least energy-efficient cryptocurrency, using 707.6 kilowatt-hours of electricity per transaction.

A study in 2015 investigated the global electricity usage that can be ascribed to Communication Technology (CT) between 2010 and 2030. Electricity usage from CT was divided into four principle categories: (i) consumer devices, including personal computers, mobile phones, TVs and home entertainment systems; (ii) network infrastructure; (iii) data center computation and storage; and lastly (iv) production of the above categories. The study estimated for the worst-case scenario, that CT electricity usage could contribute up to 23% of the globally released greenhouse gas emissions in 2030.

==== Health care ====
The healthcare sector produces 4.4–4.6% of global greenhouse gas emissions.

Based on the 2013 life cycle emissions in the health care sector, it is estimated that the GHG emissions associated with US health care activities may cause an additional 123,000 to 381,000 DALYs annually.

==== Water supply and sanitation ====
Solutions exist to reduce the greenhouse gas emissions of water and sanitation services. These solutions into three categories which partly overlap: Firstly "reducing water and energy consumption through lean and efficient approaches"; secondly "embracing circular economy to produce energy and valuable products"; and thirdly by "planning to reduce GHG emissions through strategic decisions". The mentioned lean and efficient approaches include for example finding ways to reduce water loss from water networks and to reduce infiltration of rainwater or groundwater into sewers. Also, incentives can to encourage households and industries to reduce their water consumption and their energy requirements for water heating. There is another method to reduce the energy requirements for the treatment of raw water to make drinking water out of it: protecting the quality of the source water better.

==== Tourism ====
According to UNEP, global tourism is a significant contributor to the increasing concentrations of greenhouse gases in the atmosphere, with air travel accounting for a substantial share of tourism's carbon footprint—up to 70% in some countries like Iceland.

Recent studies show that tourism produces around 1 kg of CO_{2} per dollar spent—about 25% higher than the global economic average—highlighting its substantial carbon intensity.

== Emissions by other characteristics ==
The responsibility for anthropogenic climate change differs substantially among individuals, e.g. between groups or cohorts.

=== By type of energy source ===
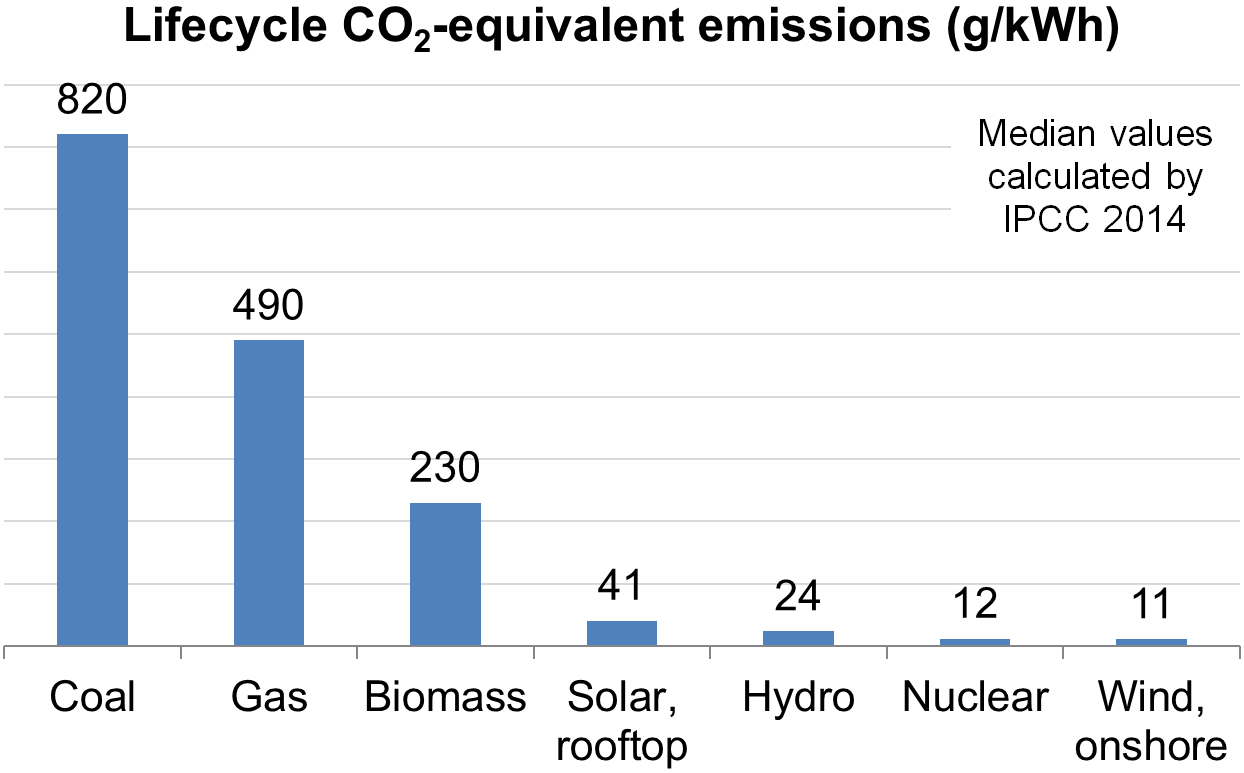
Life-cycle greenhouse gas emissions of electricity supply technologies, median values calculated by IPCC

Greenhouse gas emissions are one of the environmental impacts of electricity generation. Measurement of life-cycle greenhouse gas emissions involves calculating the global warming potential (GWP) of energy sources through life-cycle assessment. These are usually sources of only electrical energy but sometimes sources of heat are evaluated. The findings are presented in units of global warming potential per unit of electrical energy generated by that source. The scale uses the global warming potential unit, the carbon dioxide equivalent (CO_{2}e), and the unit of electrical energy, the kilowatt hour (kWh). The goal of such assessments is to cover the full life of the source, from material and fuel mining through construction to operation and waste management.

In 2014, the Intergovernmental Panel on Climate Change harmonized the carbon dioxide equivalent (CO_{2}e) findings of the major electricity generating sources in use worldwide. This was done by analyzing the findings of hundreds of individual scientific papers assessing each energy source. Coal is by far the worst emitter, followed by natural gas, with solar, wind and nuclear all low-carbon. Hydropower, biomass, geothermal and ocean power may generally be low-carbon, but poor design or other factors could result in higher emissions from individual power stations.

=== By socio-economic class and age ===
This pie chart illustrates both total emissions for each income group, and emissions per person within each income group. For example, the 10% with the highest incomes are responsible for half of carbon emissions, and its members emit an average of more than five times as much per person as members of the lowest half of the income scale.

Though total CO_{2} emissions (size of pie charts) differ substantially among high-emitting regions, the pattern of higher income classes emitting more than lower income classes is consistent across regions. The world's top 1% of emitters emit over 1000 times more than the bottom 1%.

Fueled by the consumptive lifestyle of wealthy people, the wealthiest 5% of the global population has been responsible for 37% of the absolute increase in greenhouse gas emissions worldwide. It can be seen that there is a strong relationship between income and per capita carbon dioxide emissions. Almost half of the increase in absolute global emissions has been caused by the richest 10% of the population. In the newest report from the IPCC 2022, it states that the lifestyle consumptions of the poor and middle class in emerging economies produce approximately 5–50 times less the amount that the high class in already developed high-income countries. Variations in regional, and national per capita emissions partly reflect different development stages, but they also vary widely at similar income levels. The 10% of households with the highest per capita emissions contribute a disproportionately large share of global household greenhouse gas emissions.

Studies find that the most affluent citizens of the world are responsible for most environmental impacts, and robust action by them is necessary for prospects of moving towards safer environmental conditions.

According to a 2020 report by Oxfam and the Stockholm Environment Institute, the richest 1% of the global population have caused twice as much carbon emissions as the poorest 50% over the 25 years from 1990 to 2015. This was, respectively, during that period, 15% of cumulative emissions compared to 7%. The bottom half of the population is directly responsible for less than 20% of energy footprints and consume less than the top 5% in terms of trade-corrected energy. The largest disproportionality was identified to be in the domain of transport, where e.g. the top 10% consume 56% of vehicle fuel and conduct 70% of vehicle purchases. However, wealthy individuals are also often shareholders and typically have more influence and, especially in the case of billionaires, may also direct lobbying efforts, direct financial decisions, and/or control companies.

Based on a study in 32 developed countries, researchers found that "seniors in the United States and Australia have the highest per capita footprint, twice the Western average. The trend is mainly due to changes in expenditure patterns of seniors".

== Methods for reducing greenhouse gas emissions ==
Governments have taken action to reduce greenhouse gas emissions to mitigate climate change. Countries and regions listed in Annex I of the United Nations Framework Convention on Climate Change (UNFCCC) (i.e., the OECD and former planned economies of the Soviet Union) are required to submit periodic assessments to the UNFCCC of actions they are taking to address climate change. Policies implemented by governments include for example national and regional targets to reduce emissions, promoting energy efficiency, and support for an energy transition.

Climate change mitigation, also called decarbonisation, is an action to limit the greenhouse gases in the atmosphere that cause climate change. Climate change mitigation actions include conserving energy and replacing fossil fuels with clean energy sources. Secondary mitigation strategies include changes to land use and removing carbon dioxide (CO_{2}) from the atmosphere. 2022 assessments emphasize that global greenhouse gas emissions must peak before 2025 and decline by about 43% by 2030 to limit warming to 1.5 °C, requiring rapid transitions in energy, transport, and land-use systems.

The adopted climate change mitigation policies are insufficient, as they contribute to some changes but fail to accelerate transitions at the scale and speed required, and would still result in global warming of about 2.7 °C by 2100, significantly above the 2015 Paris Agreement's goal of limiting global warming to below 2 °C. Recent research shows that demand-side climate solutions—such as shifts in transportation behavior, dietary change, improved building energy efficiency, and reduced material consumption—could reduce global greenhouse gas emissions by 40% to 70% by 2050 while improving human well-being.

== Projections for future emissions ==
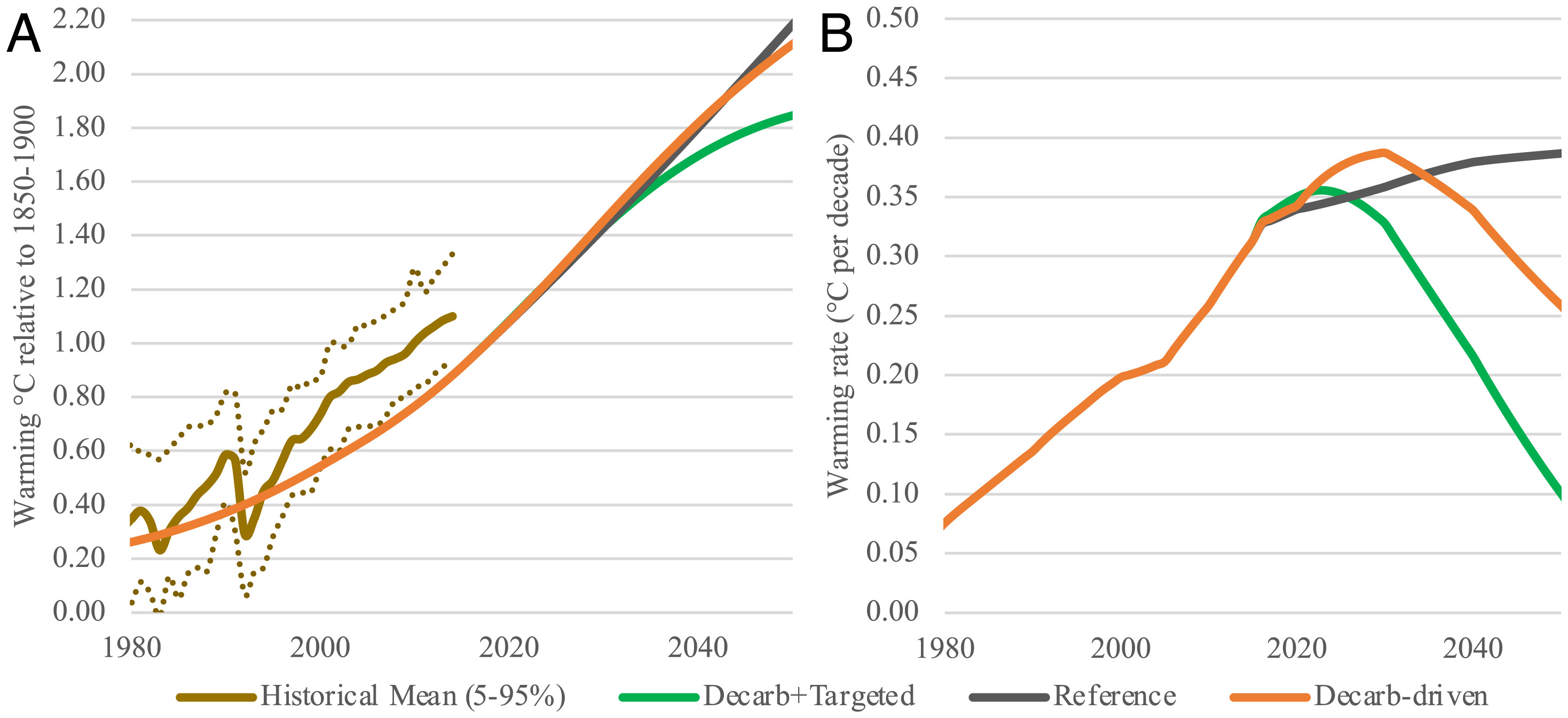
Historical and future temperature projections showing importance of mitigating short-lived climate pollutants like methane

In October 2023, the US Energy Information Administration (EIA) released a series of projections out to 2050 based on current ascertainable policy interventions. Unlike many integrated systems models in this field, emissions are allowed to float rather than be pinned to net‑zero in 2050. A sensitivity analysis varied key parameters, primarily future GDP growth (2.6% pa as reference, variously 1.8% and 3.4%) and secondarily technological learning rates, future crude oil prices, and similar exogenous inputs. The model results are far from encouraging. In no case did aggregate energy-related carbon emissions ever dip below 2022 levels (see figure 3 plot). The IEO2023 exploration provides a benchmark and suggests that far stronger action is needed.

The annual "Emissions Gap Report" by UNEP stated in 2022 that it was necessary to almost halve emissions. "To get on track for limiting global warming to 1.5°C, global annual GHG emissions must be reduced by 45 per cent compared with emissions projections under policies currently in place in just eight years, and they must continue to decline rapidly after 2030, to avoid exhausting the limited remaining atmospheric carbon budget." The report commented that the world should focus on broad-based economy-wide transformations and not incremental change.

In 2022, the Intergovernmental Panel on Climate Change (IPCC) released its Sixth Assessment Report on climate change. It warned that greenhouse gas emissions must peak before 2025 at the latest and decline 43% by 2030 to have a good chance of limiting global warming to 1.5 °C (2.7 °F). Or in the words of Secretary-General of the United Nations António Guterres: "Main emitters must drastically cut emissions starting this year".

According to a joint press release published by the German Physical society and the German meteorological society in September 2025, if the current trends will continue, global temperature can rise to 3°C above pre-industrial level by the year 2050, and by 5°C by the year 2100. The scientists emphasised the need to urgently implement already existing solutions.

== By country ==
Annually, the U.S. emitted the most CO_{2} until early in the 21st century, when China's annual emissions began to dominate.

Per capita carbon dioxide emissions show countertrends over time among the top six emitters.

In 2023, China, the United States, India, EU, Russia, Japan, and Iran – the world's largest CO_{2} emitters – together accounted for 69.7% of total global fossil CO_{2} emissions.

=== List of countries ===
List of countries by carbon emissions
| Location | % of global total | Fossil emissions (1,000,000 tons per year) | | % change from 2000 |
| Location | % of global total | 2023 | 2000 | % change from 2000 |
|---|---|---|---|---|
| World | 100% | 39,023.94 | 25,725.44 | ▲ +52% |
| China | 34.0% | 13,259.64 | 3,666.95 | ▲ +262% |
| United States | 12.0% | 4,682.04 | 5,928.97 | ▼ −21% |
| India | 7.6% | 2,955.18 | 995.65 | ▲ +197% |
| European Union post-Brexit | 6.5% | 2,517.27 | 3,566.76 | ▼ −29% |
| Russia | 5.3% | 2,069.50 | 1,681.14 | ▲ +23% |
| Japan | 2.4% | 944.76 | 1,248.81 | ▼ −24% |
| Iran | 2.0% | 778.80 | 353.93 | ▲ +120% |
| International Shipping | 1.8% | 706.32 | 503.29 | ▲ +40% |
| Indonesia | 1.7% | 674.54 | 299.09 | ▲ +126% |
| Saudi Arabia | 1.6% | 622.91 | 265.24 | ▲ +135% |
| Germany | 1.5% | 582.95 | 871.74 | ▼ −33% |
| Canada | 1.5% | 575.01 | 543.04 | ▲ +6% |
| South Korea | 1.5% | 573.54 | 474.16 | ▲ +21% |
| International Aviation | 1.3% | 491.63 | 355.32 | ▲ +38% |
| Mexico | 1.2% | 487.09 | 396.71 | ▲ +23% |
| Brazil | 1.2% | 479.50 | 349.40 | ▲ +37% |
| Turkey | 1.1% | 438.32 | 227.05 | ▲ +93% |
| South Africa | 1.0% | 397.37 | 347.30 | ▲ +14% |
| Australia | 1.0% | 373.62 | 353.87 | ▲ +6% |
| Vietnam | 1.0% | 372.95 | 56.52 | ▲ +560% |
| Italy, San Marino and Vatican City | 0.8% | 305.49 | 454.72 | ▼ −33% |
| United Kingdom | 0.8% | 302.10 | 551.68 | ▼ −45% |
| Poland | 0.7% | 286.91 | 313.02 | ▼ −8% |
| Malaysia | 0.7% | 283.32 | 130.78 | ▲ +117% |
| France and Monaco | 0.7% | 282.43 | 401.21 | ▼ −30% |
| Taiwan | 0.7% | 279.85 | 238.02 | ▲ +18% |
| Thailand | 0.7% | 274.16 | 174.82 | ▲ +57% |
| Egypt | 0.6% | 249.33 | 127.91 | ▲ +95% |
| Kazakhstan | 0.6% | 239.87 | 132.22 | ▲ +81% |
| Spain and Andorra | 0.6% | 217.26 | 313.24 | ▼ −31% |
| United Arab Emirates | 0.5% | 205.99 | 88.46 | ▲ +133% |
| Pakistan | 0.5% | 200.51 | 111.87 | ▲ +79% |
| Iraq | 0.5% | 192.91 | 88.81 | ▲ +117% |
| Argentina | 0.5% | 183.78 | 136.76 | ▲ +34% |
| Algeria | 0.5% | 180.36 | 87.94 | ▲ +105% |
| Philippines | 0.4% | 161.29 | 74.25 | ▲ +117% |
| Uzbekistan | 0.4% | 137.90 | 130.67 | ▲ +6% |
| Ukraine | 0.3% | 136.20 | 360.02 | ▼ −62% |
| Nigeria | 0.3% | 127.94 | 100.30 | ▲ +28% |
| Qatar | 0.3% | 127.91 | 31.75 | ▲ +303% |
| Bangladesh | 0.3% | 124.79 | 26.97 | ▲ +363% |
| Netherlands | 0.3% | 122.87 | 176.91 | ▼ −31% |
| Kuwait | 0.3% | 111.63 | 54.48 | ▲ +105% |
| Colombia | 0.3% | 100.86 | 62.57 | ▲ +61% |
| Oman | 0.2% | 93.09 | 26.32 | ▲ +254% |
| Czech Republic | 0.2% | 90.51 | 132.31 | ▼ −32% |
| Venezuela | 0.2% | 84.60 | 137.75 | ▼ −39% |
| Belgium | 0.2% | 84.31 | 124.97 | ▼ −33% |
| Chile | 0.2% | 84.00 | 53.85 | ▲ +56% |
| Romania | 0.2% | 70.77 | 97.42 | ▼ −27% |
| Morocco | 0.2% | 69.86 | 33.56 | ▲ +108% |
| Turkmenistan | 0.2% | 65.99 | 39.34 | ▲ +68% |
| North Korea | 0.2% | 64.27 | 73.81 | ▼ −13% |
| Libya | 0.2% | 61.26 | 49.28 | ▲ +24% |
| Israel and Palestine | 0.2% | 61.25 | 59.30 | ▲ +3% |
| Austria | 0.2% | 58.82 | 66.69 | ▼ −12% |
| Peru | 0.1% | 58.40 | 28.98 | ▲ +102% |
| Singapore | 0.1% | 57.07 | 45.52 | ▲ +25% |
| Serbia and Montenegro | 0.1% | 56.12 | 50.64 | ▲ +11% |
| Belarus | 0.1% | 54.18 | 56.26 | ▼ −4% |
| Greece | 0.1% | 51.67 | 96.05 | ▼ −46% |
| Ecuador | 0.1% | 45.33 | 22.04 | ▲ +106% |
| Norway | 0.1% | 44.07 | 41.77 | ▲ +5% |
| Hungary | 0.1% | 43.83 | 59.48 | ▼ −26% |
| Azerbaijan | 0.1% | 42.77 | 28.79 | ▲ +49% |
| Bulgaria | 0.1% | 39.79 | 48.17 | ▼ −17% |
| Bahrain | 0.1% | 37.43 | 17.77 | ▲ +111% |
| Portugal | 0.09% | 36.17 | 64.41 | ▼ −44% |
| New Zealand | 0.09% | 35.80 | 32.89 | ▲ +9% |
| Sweden | 0.09% | 35.39 | 57.98 | ▼ −39% |
| Slovakia | 0.09% | 34.86 | 41.68 | ▼ −16% |
| Hong Kong | 0.09% | 34.67 | 41.90 | ▼ −17% |
| Switzerland and Liechtenstein | 0.09% | 34.22 | 44.80 | ▼ −24% |
| Myanmar | 0.09% | 33.37 | 10.04 | ▲ +232% |
| Ireland | 0.08% | 32.48 | 43.82 | ▼ −26% |
| Finland | 0.08% | 32.27 | 57.53 | ▼ −44% |
| Tunisia | 0.08% | 31.50 | 21.13 | ▲ +49% |
| Dominican Republic | 0.08% | 31.35 | 19.01 | ▲ +65% |
| Angola | 0.07% | 28.23 | 16.51 | ▲ +71% |
| Mongolia | 0.07% | 28.12 | 9.04 | ▲ +211% |
| Trinidad and Tobago | 0.07% | 27.22 | 19.13 | ▲ +42% |
| Denmark | 0.07% | 26.77 | 53.16 | ▼ −50% |
| Laos | 0.07% | 26.02 | 0.93 | ▲ +2% |
| Syria | 0.07% | 25.59 | 45.90 | ▼ −44% |
| Ghana | 0.06% | 24.16 | 6.09 | ▲ +297% |
| Bolivia | 0.06% | 23.81 | 8.20 | ▲ +190% |
| Jordan | 0.06% | 23.58 | 16.47 | ▲ +43% |
| Cuba | 0.06% | 22.07 | 28.99 | ▼ −24% |
| Bosnia and Herzegovina | 0.06% | 22.00 | 14.28 | ▲ +54% |
| Kenya | 0.06% | 21.73 | 8.91 | ▲ +144% |
| Guatemala | 0.05% | 21.35 | 9.69 | ▲ +120% |
| Sudan and South Sudan | 0.05% | 21.27 | 6.00 | ▲ +255% |
| Sri Lanka | 0.05% | 20.52 | 11.46 | ▲ +79% |
| Tanzania | 0.05% | 19.37 | 3.11 | ▲ +523% |
| Cambodia | 0.05% | 17.97 | 2.00 | ▲ +798% |
| Nepal | 0.05% | 17.93 | 3.42 | ▲ +424% |
| Croatia | 0.04% | 17.46 | 19.37 | ▼ −10% |
| Lebanon | 0.04% | 17.33 | 15.31 | ▲ +13% |
| Ethiopia | 0.04% | 16.71 | 3.88 | ▲ +331% |
| Panama | 0.04% | 14.72 | 5.19 | ▲ +184% |
| Ivory Coast | 0.04% | 14.41 | 6.97 | ▲ +107% |
| Puerto Rico | 0.04% | 13.82 | 25.18 | ▼ −45% |
| Lithuania | 0.03% | 13.11 | 11.66 | ▲ +13% |
| Georgia | 0.03% | 12.86 | 5.21 | ▲ +147% |
| Slovenia | 0.03% | 12.08 | 15.04 | ▼ −20% |
| Senegal | 0.03% | 12.02 | 3.99 | ▲ +201% |
| Zimbabwe | 0.03% | 11.74 | 14.60 | ▼ −20% |
| Estonia | 0.03% | 11.44 | 17.38 | ▼ −34% |
| Honduras | 0.03% | 10.95 | 5.00 | ▲ +119% |
| Yemen | 0.03% | 10.90 | 15.74 | ▼ −31% |
| Cameroon | 0.03% | 10.76 | 5.73 | ▲ +88% |
| Kyrgyzstan | 0.03% | 10.46 | 4.80 | ▲ +118% |
| Moldova | 0.03% | 9.93 | 6.89 | ▲ +44% |
| Mozambique | 0.02% | 9.74 | 1.57 | ▲ +520% |
| Brunei | 0.02% | 9.72 | 6.07 | ▲ +60% |
| Tajikistan | 0.02% | 9.31 | 2.78 | ▲ +234% |
| Uruguay | 0.02% | 8.82 | 5.57 | ▲ +58% |
| North Macedonia | 0.02% | 8.76 | 9.04 | ▼ −3% |
| Afghanistan | 0.02% | 8.71 | 1.02 | ▲ +757% |
| Costa Rica | 0.02% | 8.57 | 5.12 | ▲ +67% |
| El Salvador | 0.02% | 8.38 | 5.80 | ▲ +45% |
| Paraguay | 0.02% | 8.25 | 3.64 | ▲ +127% |
| Zambia | 0.02% | 8.06 | 1.95 | ▲ +313% |
| Armenia | 0.02% | 7.73 | 3.57 | ▲ +116% |
| Botswana | 0.02% | 7.42 | 4.10 | ▲ +81% |
| Congo | 0.02% | 7.25 | 4.51 | ▲ +61% |
| Uganda | 0.02% | 7.22 | 1.41 | ▲ +411% |
| Cyprus | 0.02% | 7.18 | 7.13 | ▲ +1% |
| Luxembourg | 0.02% | 7.01 | 8.80 | ▼ −20% |
| Jamaica | 0.02% | 6.86 | 10.21 | ▼ −33% |
| Mali | 0.02% | 6.66 | 0.80 | ▲ +730% |
| Latvia | 0.02% | 6.55 | 7.23 | ▼ −9% |
| Malawi | 0.02% | 6.45 | 3.10 | ▲ +108% |
| Benin | 0.02% | 6.44 | 1.54 | ▲ +317% |
| New Caledonia | 0.02% | 6.21 | 2.18 | ▲ +185% |
| Burkina Faso | 0.02% | 6.00 | 0.88 | ▲ +583% |
| Papua New Guinea | 0.02% | 5.95 | 2.95 | ▲ +102% |
| Nicaragua | 0.01% | 5.73 | 3.77 | ▲ +52% |
| Gabon | 0.01% | 4.93 | 6.60 | ▼ −25% |
| Mauritania | 0.01% | 4.65 | 1.07 | ▲ +336% |
| Albania | 0.01% | 4.59 | 3.23 | ▲ +42% |
| Namibia | 0.01% | 4.36 | 1.95 | ▲ +124% |
| Mauritius | 0.01% | 4.21 | 2.44 | ▲ +73% |
| Madagascar | 0.01% | 4.10 | 1.69 | ▲ +142% |
| Democratic Republic of the Congo | 0.01% | 3.80 | 1.88 | ▲ +102% |
| Equatorial Guinea | 0.01% | 3.78 | 2.74 | ▲ +38% |
| Guinea | 0.01% | 3.72 | 1.47 | ▲ +153% |
| Haiti | 0.009% | 3.54 | 1.69 | ▲ +109% |
| Guyana | 0.008% | 3.30 | 1.66 | ▲ +99% |
| Iceland | 0.008% | 3.09 | 2.85 | ▲ +8% |
| Macao | 0.008% | 3.01 | 1.48 | ▲ +104% |
| Maldives | 0.007% | 2.88 | 0.64 | ▲ +352% |
| Niger | 0.007% | 2.82 | 0.70 | ▲ +302% |
| Suriname | 0.007% | 2.63 | 1.48 | ▲ +78% |
| Chad | 0.007% | 2.57 | 0.24 | ▲ +962% |
| Réunion | 0.007% | 2.57 | 2.05 | ▲ +25% |
| Togo | 0.006% | 2.49 | 1.25 | ▲ +99% |
| Curaçao | 0.006% | 2.43 | 5.67 | ▼ −57% |
| Fiji | 0.006% | 2.21 | 1.46 | ▲ +51% |
| Bhutan | 0.005% | 1.99 | 0.41 | ▲ +388% |
| Malta | 0.004% | 1.68 | 2.13 | ▼ −21% |
| Bahamas | 0.004% | 1.68 | 1.00 | ▲ +69% |
| Rwanda | 0.004% | 1.65 | 0.68 | ▲ +142% |
| Liberia | 0.004% | 1.64 | 0.40 | ▲ +307% |
| Palau | 0.004% | 1.44 | 2.12 | ▼ −32% |
| Eswatini | 0.004% | 1.39 | 1.10 | ▲ +27% |
| French Polynesia | 0.003% | 1.26 | 0.72 | ▲ +75% |
| Seychelles | 0.003% | 1.24 | 0.76 | ▲ +63% |
| Guadeloupe | 0.003% | 1.17 | 0.62 | ▲ +89% |
| Martinique | 0.003% | 1.09 | 0.67 | ▲ +62% |
| Sierra Leone | 0.003% | 1.07 | 0.43 | ▲ +147% |
| Cape Verde | 0.003% | 1.01 | 0.28 | ▲ +256% |
| Lesotho | 0.002% | 0.88 | 0.35 | ▲ +148% |
| Somalia | 0.002% | 0.87 | 0.63 | ▲ +38% |
| Burundi | 0.002% | 0.84 | 0.29 | ▲ +186% |
| Barbados | 0.002% | 0.80 | 0.59 | ▲ +35% |
| Djibouti | 0.002% | 0.75 | 0.74 | ▲ +1% |
| East Timor | 0.002% | 0.70 | 0.23 | ▲ +208% |
| Gibraltar | 0.002% | 0.69 | 0.34 | ▲ +102% |
| Eritrea | 0.002% | 0.67 | 0.67 | no change% |
| Gambia | 0.002% | 0.61 | 0.27 | ▲ +126% |
| Greenland | 0.001% | 0.58 | 0.00 | ▲ +43% |
| Aruba | 0.001% | 0.53 | 0.27 | ▲ +97% |
| Samoa | 0.001% | 0.47 | 0.19 | ▲ +149% |
| Solomon Islands | 0.001% | 0.42 | 0.24 | ▲ +78% |
| French Guiana | 0.001% | 0.38 | 0.17 | ▲ +119% |
| Central African Republic | 0.001% | 0.37 | 0.26 | ▲ +43% |
| Cayman Islands | 0.001% | 0.36 | 0.13 | ▲ +172% |
| Bermuda | 0.001% | 0.35 | 0.15 | ▲ +133% |
| Guinea-Bissau | 0.001% | 0.35 | 0.20 | ▲ +71% |
| Antigua and Barbuda | 0.001% | 0.32 | 0.14 | ▲ +139% |
| Comoros | 0.001% | 0.32 | 0.09 | ▲ +250% |
| Saint Lucia | 0.001% | 0.30 | 0.10 | ▲ +207% |
| Vanuatu | 0.001% | 0.29 | 0.08 | ▲ +238% |
| Belize | 0.001% | 0.28 | 0.14 | ▲ +101% |
| Western Sahara | 0.001% | 0.26 | 0.26 | ▲ +4% |
| Tonga | 0.001% | 0.22 | 0.10 | ▲ +118% |
| São Tomé and Príncipe | 0.001% | 0.21 | 0.06 | ▲ +288% |
| Grenada | 0.0004% | 0.14 | 0.06 | ▲ +149% |
| Cook Islands | 0.0004% | 0.14 | 0.06 | ▲ +133% |
| Saint Kitts and Nevis | 0.0003% | 0.12 | 0.05 | ▲ +140% |
| Turks and Caicos Islands | 0.0003% | 0.10 | 0.02 | ▲ +481% |
| Kiribati | 0.0002% | 0.10 | 0.03 | ▲ +197% |
| Saint Vincent and the Grenadines | 0.0002% | 0.10 | 0.04 | ▲ +131% |
| Dominica | 0.0002% | 0.08 | 0.06 | ▲ +44% |
| British Virgin Islands | 0.0002% | 0.08 | 0.03 | ▲ +172% |
| Saint Pierre and Miquelon | 0.0001% | 0.04 | 0.02 | ▲ +129% |
| Anguilla | 0.0001% | 0.02 | 0.02 | ▲ +48% |
| Falkland Islands | 0.0000% | 0.02 | 0.01 | ▲ +170% |
| Saint Helena, Ascension and Tristan da Cunha | 0.0000% | 0.02 | 0.01 | ▲ +58% |
| Faroe Islands | 0.0000% | 0.00 | 0.00 | ▲ +20% |

=== United States ===
Though the U.S.'s per capita and per GDP emissions have declined significantly, the raw numerical decline in emissions is much less substantial.

The United States produced 7 billion metric tons of carbon dioxide equivalent greenhouse gas (GHG) emissions in 2025, the second largest in the world after greenhouse gas emissions by China and among the countries with the highest greenhouse gas emissions per person. In 2025 China is estimated to have emitted 29% of world GHG, followed by the United States with 12%, then India with 7%. In total the United States has emitted a quarter of world GHG, more than any other country. Annual emissions are over 15 tons per person and, amongst the top eight emitters, it is the highest country by greenhouse gas emissions per person.

=== China ===
The total greenhouse gas emissions of the People's Republic of China are the world's highest, accounting for 35% of the world's total, in 2023, according to the International Energy Agency. The country's emissions may have peaked in 2024 or 2025.

=== India ===
India emits about 3 gigatonnes (Gt) CO_{2eq} of greenhouse gases each year which makes up about 7% of total annual global emissions.

According to data from the Climate Change Tracker, India has contributed 169,898.56 megatonnes of carbon dioxide since 1851, accounting for 4.62% of the historic total. India's per capita emissions are rated "low", at 1.85 tonnes per capita per year. However, this reflects the country's large population which dilutes the per capita footprint despite high overall emissions. Furthermore, India's energy use per capita increased by 11% from 2014 to 2019.

== Society and culture ==
=== Impacts of the COVID-19 pandemic ===
In 2020, carbon dioxide emissions fell by 6.4% or 2.3 billion tonnes globally. In April 2020, NO_{x} emissions fell by up to 30%. In China, lockdowns and other measures resulted in a 26% decrease in coal consumption, and a 50% reduction in nitrogen oxide emissions. Greenhouse gas emissions rebounded later in the pandemic as many countries began lifting restrictions, with the direct impact of pandemic policies having a negligible long-term impact on climate change.

== See also ==
- Arctic methane emissions – Release of methane in the Arctic
- Carbon offsets and credits – Carbon dioxide reduction scheme
- List of locations and entities by greenhouse gas emissions
- Low-carbon economy – Climate-friendly economy
- Net-zero emissions – Rate of human-caused greenhouse gas emissions
- World energy supply and consumption – Global production and usage of energy
