= Fugitive emission =

Unintended release of gases

Fugitive emissions are leaks and other irregular releases of gases or vapors from a pressurized containment—such as appliances, storage tanks, pipelines, wells, or other pieces of equipment—mostly from industrial activities. In addition to the economic cost of lost commodities, fugitive emissions contribute to local air pollution and may cause further environmental harm. Common industrial gases include refrigerants and natural gas, while less common examples are perfluorocarbons, sulfur hexafluoride, and nitrogen trifluoride.

Most occurrences of fugitive emissions are small, of no immediate impact, and difficult to detect. Nevertheless due to rapidly expanding activity, even the most strictly regulated gases have accumulated outside of industrial workings to reach measurable levels globally. Fugitive emissions include many poorly understood pathways by which the most potent and long-lived ozone depleting substances and greenhouse gases enter Earth's atmosphere.

In particular, the build-up of a variety of man-made halogenated gases over the past several decades contributes more than 10% of the radiative forcing which drives global climate change as of year 2020. Moreover, the ongoing banking of small to large quantities of these gases within consumer appliances, industrial systems, and abandoned equipment throughout the world has all but guaranteed their future emissions for many years to come. Fugitive emissions of CFCs and HCFCs from legacy equipment and process uses have continued to hinder recovery of the stratospheric ozone layer in the years since most production was banned in accordance with the international Montreal Protocol.

Similar legacy issues continue to be created at ever-increasing scale with the mining of fossil hydrocarbons, including gas venting and fugitive gas emissions from coal mines, oil wells, and gas wells. Economically depleted mines and wells may be abandoned or poorly sealed, while properly decommissioned facilities may experience emission increases following equipment failures or earth disturbances. Satellite monitoring systems are beginning to be developed and deployed to aid identification of the largest emitters, sometimes known as super-emitters.

== Emissions inventory ==
A detailed inventory of greenhouse gas emissions from upstream oil and gas activities in Canada for the year 2000 estimated that fugitive equipment leaks had a global warming potential equivalent to the release of 17 million metric tonnes of carbon dioxide, or 12 percent of all greenhouse gases emitted by the sector, while another report put fugitive emissions at 5.2% of world greenhouse emissions in 2013. Venting of natural gas, flaring, accidental releases and storage losses accounted for an additional 38 percent.

Fugitive emissions present other risks and hazards. Emissions of volatile organic compounds such as benzene from oil refineries and chemical plants pose a long term health risk to workers and local communities. In situations where large amounts of flammable liquids and gases are contained under pressure, leaks also increase the risk of fire and explosion.

== Pressurized equipment ==
Leaks from pressurized process equipment generally occur through valves, pipe connections, mechanical seals, or related equipment. Fugitive emissions also occur at evaporative sources such as waste water treatment ponds and storage tanks. Because of the huge number of potential leak sources at large industrial facilities and the difficulties in detecting and repairing some leaks, fugitive emissions can be a significant proportion of total emissions. Though the quantities of leaked gases may be small, gases that have serious health or environmental impacts can cause a significant problem.

== Fenceline monitoring ==
Fenceline monitoring techniques involve the use of samplers and detectors positioned at the fenceline of a facility. Several types of devices are used to provide data on a facility's fugitive emissions, including passive samplers with sorbent tubes, and "SPod" sensors that provide real-time data. These systems are often integrated into broader leak detection and repair programs to ensure compliance and manage air quality in communities.

== Detection and repair ==
To minimize and control leaks at process facilities operators carry out regular leak detection and repair activities. Routine inspections of process equipment with gas detectors can be used to identify leaks and estimate the leak rate in order to decide on appropriate corrective action. Proper routine maintenance of equipment reduces the likelihood of leaks.

Because of the technical difficulties and costs of detecting and quantifying actual fugitive emissions at a site or facility, and the variability and intermittent nature of emission flow rates, bottom-up estimates based on standard emission factors are generally used for annual reporting purposes.

== New technologies ==
New technologies are under development that could revolutionize the detection and monitoring of fugitive emissions. One technology, known as differential absorption lidar (DIAL), can be used to remotely measure concentration profiles of hydrocarbons in the atmosphere up to several hundred meters from a facility. DIAL has been used for refinery surveys in Europe for over 15 years. A pilot study carried out in 2005 using DIAL found that actual emissions at a refinery were fifteen times higher than those previously reported using the emission factor approach. The fugitive emissions were equivalent to 0.17% of the refinery throughput.

Portable gas leak imaging cameras are also a new technology that can be used to improve leak detection and repair, leading to reduced fugitive emissions. The cameras use infrared imaging technology to produce video images in which invisible gases escaping from leak sources can be clearly identified.

== Types ==
=== Natural gas ===
Fugitive gas emissions are emissions of gas (typically natural gas, which contains methane) to atmosphere or groundwater which result from oil and gas or coal mining activity. In 2016, these emissions, when converted to their equivalent impact of carbon dioxide, accounted for 5.8% of all global greenhouse gas emissions.

Most fugitive emissions are the result of loss of well integrity through poorly sealed well casings due to geochemically unstable cement. This allows gas to escape through the well itself (known as surface casing vent flow) or via lateral migration along adjacent geological formations (known as gas migration). Approximately 1-3% of methane leakage cases in unconventional oil and gas wells are caused by imperfect seals and deteriorating cement in wellbores. Some leaks are also the result of leaks in equipment, intentional pressure release practices, or accidental releases during normal transportation, storage, and distribution activities.

Emissions can be measured using either ground-based or airborne techniques. In Canada, the oil and gas industry is thought to be the largest source of greenhouse gas and methane emissions, and approximately 40% of Canada's emissions originate from Alberta. Emissions are largely self-reported by companies. The Alberta Energy Regulator keeps a database on wells releasing fugitive gas emissions in Alberta, and the British Columbia Oil and Gas Commission keeps a database of leaky wells in British Columbia. Testing wells at the time of drilling was not required in British Columbia until 2010, and since then 19% of new wells have reported leakage problems. This number may be a low estimate, as suggested by fieldwork completed by the David Suzuki Foundation. Some studies have shown a range of 6-30% of wells suffer gas leakage.

Canada and Alberta have plans for policies to reduce emissions, which may help combat climate change. Costs related to reducing emissions are very location-dependent and can vary widely. Methane has a greater global warming impact than carbon dioxide, as its radiative force is 120, 86 and 34 times that of carbon dioxide, when considering a 1, 20 and 100 year time frame (including Climate Carbon Feedback Additionally, it leads to increases in carbon dioxide concentration through its oxidation by water vapor.

== See also ==
- Gas flare
- Greenhouse gas
- Volatile organic compound
- Fugitive gas emissions
