= Sorbent tube =

Sorbent tubes are the most widely used collection media for sampling hazardous gases and vapors in air, mostly as it relates to industrial hygiene. They were developed by the US National Institute for Occupational Safety and Health (NIOSH) for air quality testing of workers. Sorbent Tubes are available from CARO Analytical Services, SKC Inc., 7Solutions BV, Uniphos Ltd., SKC Ltd, Zefon International, Sigma-Aldrich/Supelco and Markes International. SKC Inc. manufactured the first commercially available sorbent tubes. XAD2 Tubes.

Sorbent tubes are typically made of glass and contain various types of solid adsorbent material (sorbents). Commonly used sorbents include activated charcoal, silica gel, and organic porous polymers such as Tenax and Amberlite XAD resins. Solid sorbents are selected for sampling specific compounds in air because they:

1. Trap and retain the compound(s) of interest even in the presence of other compounds
2. Do not alter the compound(s) of interest
3. Allow collected compounds to be easily desorbed or extracted for analysis

Sorbent tubes are attached to air sampling pumps for sample collection. A pump with a calibrated flow rate in ml/min is normally placed on a worker’s belt and it draws a known volume of air through the sorbent tube. Alternatively, pumps and sorbent tubes are placed in areas for fixed-point sampling. Chemicals are trapped onto the sorbent material throughout the sampling period.

Occasionally, when desorbing the air sample from the sorbent tube, a large portion of the analyte will fail to go into the solution. In these cases, the sorbent tubes will have to be adjusted for desorption efficiency (DE).
