= Powder deaerator =

Powder Deaerators (also powder compactor or powder densifier) are working apparatuses for deaerating and compacting of dry, fine-grained powders. The machine removes excess air and open spaces in the powder, leaving it a more solid, compact, material.

== Construction ==
Powder Deaerators consist of two parallel drums – a filter drum and a pressure drum – which rotate in opposite directions. The drums are driven via drive motor and spur gear. The filter drum is coated with a porous sinter metal layer. It is connected to a vacuum line via a hollow shaft creating a negative pressure within the filter drum. An adjusting device serves for the setting of the gap width between the rollers. On the adjusting device there are spring assemblies to generate the necessary pressure.

== Function ==
The material is aspirated (sucked in) and held on the filter drum by a vacuum, where it is drawn in the space between the filter and pressure drums. The combination of vacuum and pressure causes a deaerating and densification of the product. At the end of the densification process, the densified product is stripped off the filter drum by knives so it can leave the machine.

== Applications ==
Deaerators can be used for the deaerating and densification of all powders and other fine-piece bulk materials. The aim of the application is to raise the bulk density and/or improve the handling properties of a product. Deaerators are also used for the dosing and precompaction in granulation processes. Typical products which can be handled are silicic acid, carbon black, pigments, aluminium oxide, magnesium oxide, etc. The product temperatures can reach up to 100 °C.

== Benefits ==
Deaerators achieve savings in package, transport and storage capacity by significantly reducing the powder volume. Explosive products can also be compacted as well.
