= Recuperative multi-tube cooler =

A recuperative multi-tube cooler is a rotary drum cooler used for continuous processes in chemical engineering.

== Construction ==
Recuperative multi-tube coolers essentially exist of a turning rotor which is mostly driven via chain. At the ends of the rotor are stiff cases for product feed and outlet. The rotor is supported on running treads, as it is typical for rotary drums. The interior of the rotor exists of several tubes in a revolvertype (or planetary) arrangement. The tubes are completely surrounded by a jacket.

According to requirements recuperative multi-tube coolers are built with diameters between 1.0 and 4.0 m and lengths from 10 to 40 m.

== Function ==
Recuperative multi-tube coolers work with indirect air cooling. That means, that there is no direct contact between the product to be cooled and the cooling air. The heat is exchanged indirectly via thermal conduction. Ambient air is used as cooling air, which is drawn between the jacket and the tubes. Product and cooling air pass through the cooler in counterflow. The product to be cooled falls directly into the product feed housing. By the rotary movement and a little slope of the rotor, the product is conveyed through the cooler. The rotation causes a permanent mixing of the product in the tubes and hence a good heat transfer.

Due to the indirect method of operation, the coolers provide hot and clean air that can be reused as energy. This opportunity of recovering energy is where the term recuperative results from.

== Applications ==
The coolers can be used for the cooling of free flowing, fine grained bulk material. They are especially used when consumers of the recovered hot air are close-by. Usual this is the case in calcination processes after hotgas fired rotary kilns in or similar. The hot air is used as preheated supply of combustion air in the kilns. The consumption of primary energy can be reduced seriously.

The coolers are mostly used in the pigment industry, e.g. for cooling of titandioxide pigments after calcination. The entry temperatures of the products can reach up to 1000 °C.
