= Cellulose insulation =

Plant fiber used to insulate

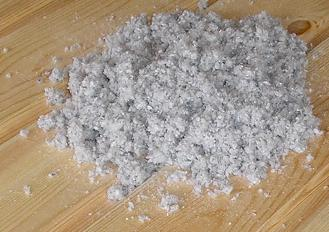
Cellulose insulation

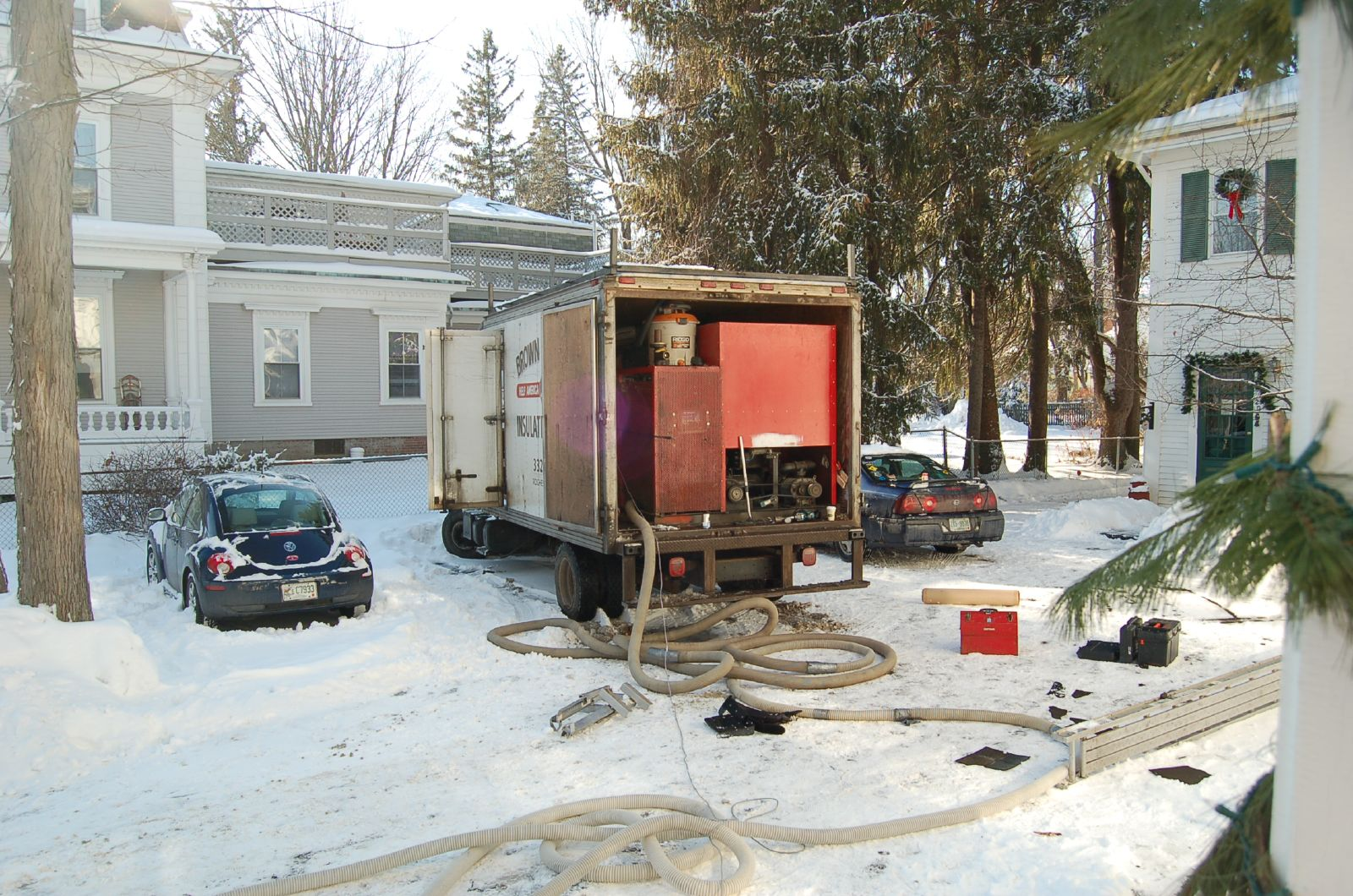
Cellulose insulation is often blown into building spaces through hoses from special blowing equipment in this case mounted inside a truck.

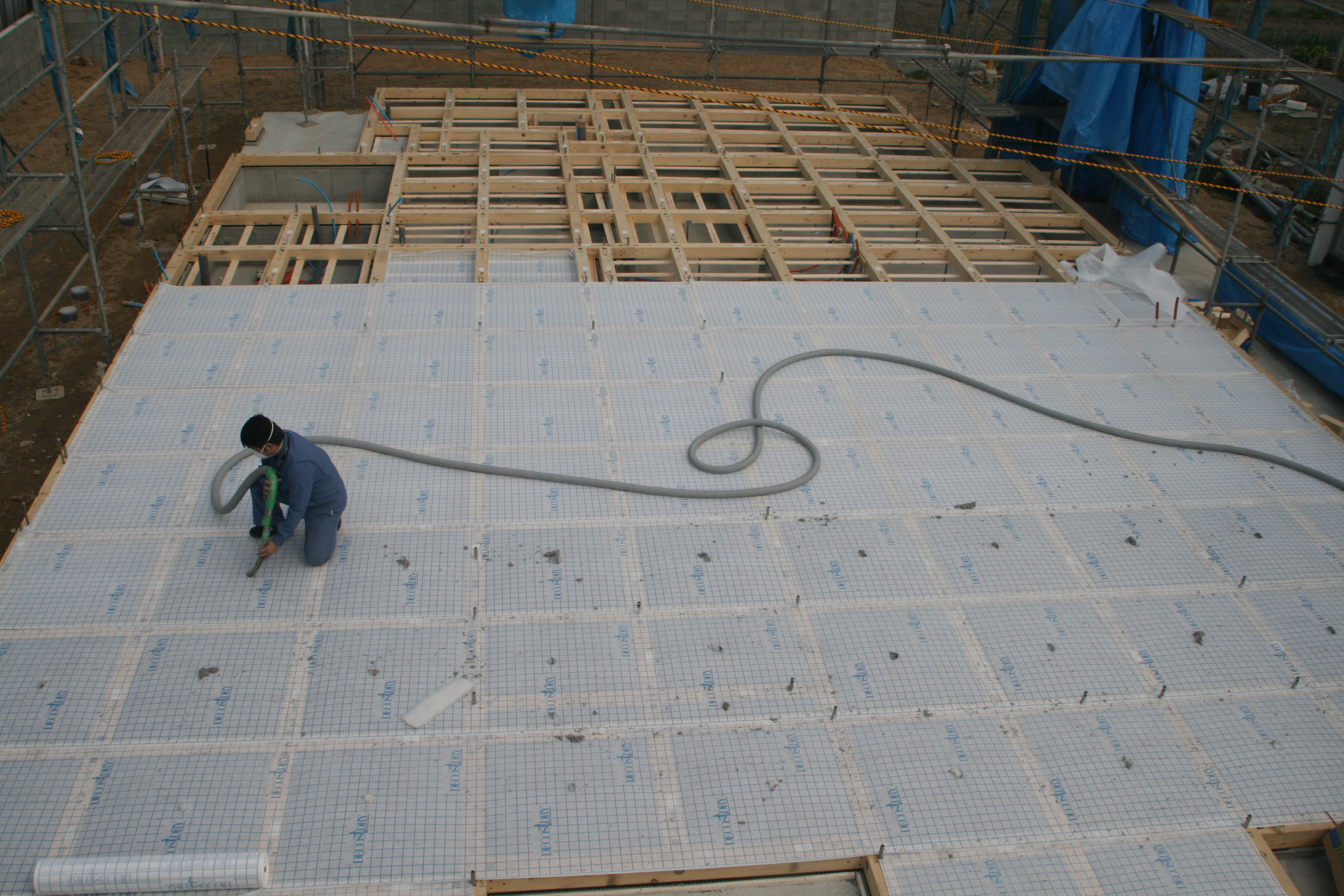
insulation of the floor

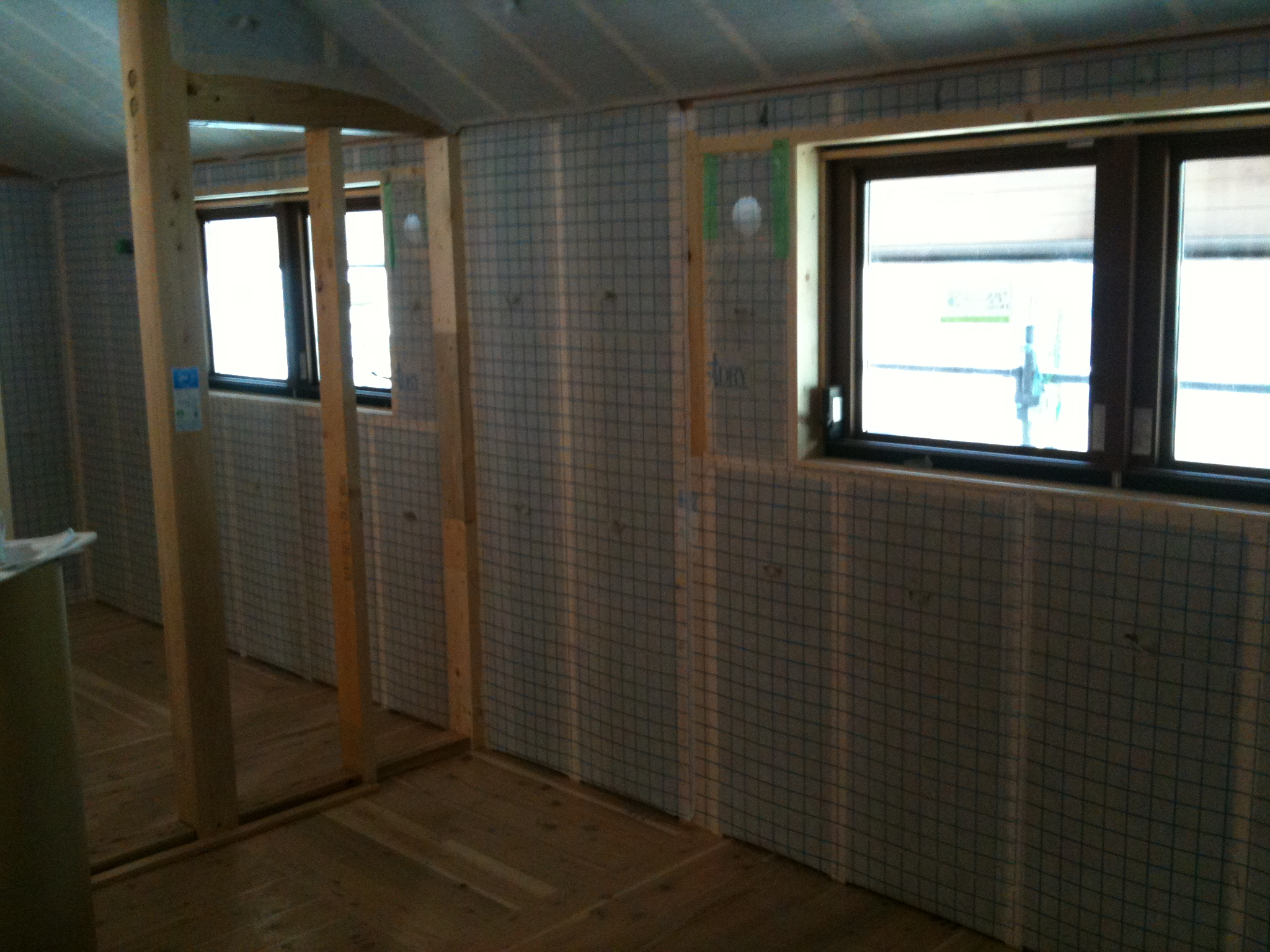
room wall

Cellulose insulation is plant fiber used in wall and roof cavities to insulate, draught proof and reduce noise. Building insulation in general is low-thermal-conductivity material used to reduce building heat loss and gain and reduce noise transmission.

== History of cellulose insulation ==
The main house of American president Thomas Jefferson's plantation Monticello was insulated with a form of cellulose in 1772. Cellulose was used more widely as an insulation material in Scandinavia from the 1920s. Many types of cellulosic materials have been used, including newspaper, cardboard, cotton, straw, sawdust, hemp and corncob. Modern cellulose insulation, made with recycled newspaper using grinding and dust-removing machines and adding a fire retardant, began in the 1950s and came into general use in the United States in the 1970s.

Demand for insulation increased following the oil embargo of 1973–74, which caused energy costs for heating to skyrocket across the United States, driving interest in energy conservation. Insulation gained significant national attention in the U.S. as a cheap and available technology to increase the energy efficiency of homes. In 1977, following a particularly severe winter, a tax credit was given for U.S. homeowners who installed insulation.

While in 1976 there were roughly 100 cellulose insulation firms with 125 plants in the US, by 1978 there were more than 350 firms with more than 500 plants. Cellulose insulation was produced locally by small manufacturers who purchased ready-to-operate machines and offered a cheap and easy low-tech production process. Other than some constraints created by a shortage of boric acid for use as fire retardant, cellulose captured an increased share of the market due to lower costs and its suitability for retrofits. Meanwhile, fiberglass and rockwool producers found it difficult to keep up with the demand for insulation from their customers.

Due to complaints by retailers, contractors and consumers about price, safety and quality control problems, the U.S. federal government began enacting insulation standards beginning in 1978. There was a great concern that the growth in cellulose manufactures was leading to improperly or insufficiently treating insulation against the threat of fire, although there were no reliable national statistics. This led to new regulations by the federal Consumer Products Safety Commission (CPSC); 16 CFR Part 1209 set safety standards covering four product attributes for cellulose insulation only: settled density, corrosiveness, critical radiant flux and smoldering combustion. Another regulation passed was the "R-value Rule," placing clear limitations on the claims that manufacturing and marketing firms can make about their product.

The costs incurred by increasing testing for fire resistance required by CPSC made cellulose more expensive, and the bad publicity helped decrease demand. Small producers of cellulose insulation were either unable to meet the testing requirements and went out of business, or they merged with other small manufacturers. In 1985 the CPSC asked Congress to repeal the flammability standard after further studies. By 1991 only 61 cellulose producers remained in the US.

The fiberglass industry meanwhile benefited from most of the regulations passed by the federal government. The heavy lobbying by the more centralized fiberglass and mineral insulation manufacturers helped pass the tough fire standards for cellulose insulation. These standards were reinforced by technical bulletins published by the Mineral Insulation Manufacturers Association (currently known as the North American Insulation Manufacturers Association) that promoted fire hazard claims against cellulose insulation. These claims were not independently verified, faced little scientific review, or were purposefully misleading and untrue .

Use of cellulose insulation has increased again in use in the United States. Part of the reason for this growth could be related to studies that suggest cellulose may actually protect a building from damage in a fire better than fiberglass because cellulose is denser and restricts the oxygen necessary to burn structural members. Several National Research Council Canada studies have backed these claims. Another major reason for the comeback of cellulose might be because of the increased interest in green building. Cellulose has the highest recycled content of any insulation material and also has less embodied energy than fiberglass and other furnace-produced mineral insulation.

== Manufacture ==
Cellulose insulation is often made by hammer milling waste newspaper. The newspaper is treated with chemicals, such as boric acid, to retard the spread of fire and to make the paper fiber less attractive to pests.

== Products ==
Four major types of loose-fill cellulose products have been developed under a variety of brand names. These are generally characterized as dry cellulose, spray-applied cellulose, stabilized cellulose, and low dust cellulose. These types are used in different parts of a building and for different reasons.

=== Dry cellulose (loose fill) ===
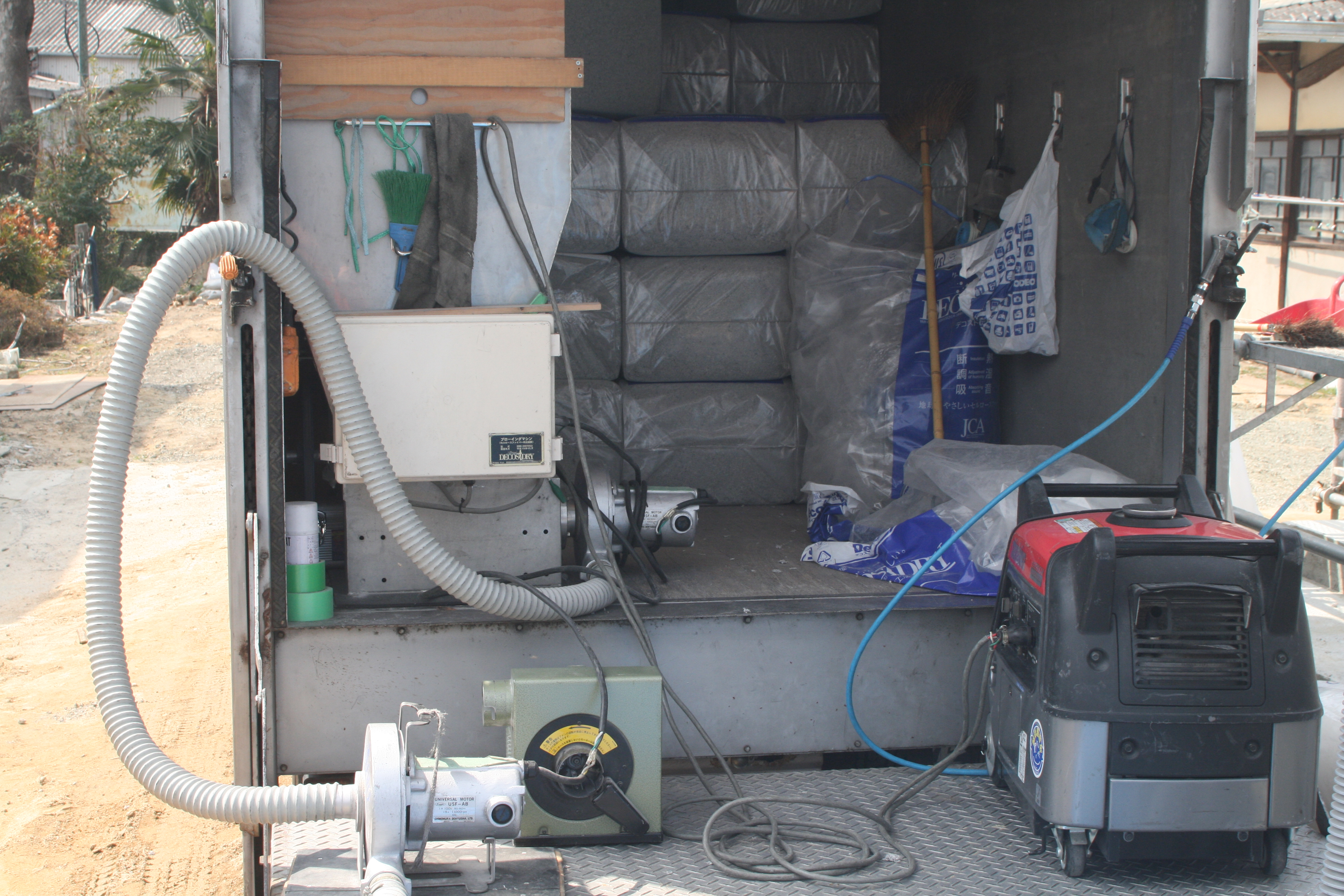
Dry cellulose blowing equipment.

Dry cellulose is used in retrofitting old homes by blowing the cellulose into holes drilled into the tops of the walls. It can also be blown into a new wall construction by using temporary retainers or netting that is clamped in place then removed once the cellulose has reached the appropriate density. This form of application does settle as much as 13% to 20% over time. This settling could leave gaps in a wall as the insulation compacts vertically, or it could leave space between a floor and the insulation beneath it. A dense-pack option can be used to reduce settling and further minimize air gaps. Dense-pack places pressure on the cavity, and should be done by an experienced installer.

Loose fill in walls is an antiquated technique of using cellulose in wall cavities. The home performance industry and its accrediting bodies support the dense-pack standard of insulating wall cavities, which does not settle. This method stops the stack effect and convective loops in wall cavities.

=== Spray-applied cellulose (wet-spray cellulose) ===
Spray-applied cellulose is used for applying cellulose to new wall construction. The differences are the addition of water to the cellulose while spraying as well as adding some kind of moisture retardant such as chlorine to prevent mold cultures. In some cases the insulation might also mix in a very small percentage of adhesive or activate a dry adhesive present in the cellulose. Wet-spray allows application without the need for a temporary retainer. In addition, wet-spray allows for an even better seal of the insulated cavity against air infiltration and eliminates settling problems. Wet-spray installation requires that the wall be allowed to dry for a minimum of 24 hours (or until maximum of 25% moisture is reached) before being covered.

=== Stabilized cellulose ===
Stabilized cellulose is used most often in attic/roof insulation. It is applied with a very small amount of water to activate an adhesive of some kind. This reduces settling and decreases the amount of cellulose needed. This can prove advantageous at reducing the overall weight of the product on the ceiling drywall helping prevent possible sag. This application is ideal for sloped roofs and has been approved for 5:12 (41.66%) slopes.

=== Low-dust cellulose ===
The last major type of cellulose insulation on the market is low-dust variety. Nuisance levels of dust are created during application of most types of dry insulation causing the need for simple dust masks to be worn during installation. This kind of cellulose has a small percentage of oil or similar dust dampener added. This may also be appropriate to homes where people are sensitive to newsprint or paper dust (though new dust will not be created after installation).

== Advantages of cellulose insulation ==
=== Thermal performance ===
The thermal performance of loose filled cellulose compares favourably to other types of low cost insulation, but is lower than that of polyurethane and polyisocyanurate foams. The thermal conductivity of loose-fill cellulose is approximately 40 mW/m·K (R-value: metric R2.6 per 100 mm; imperial R3.8 per inch) which is about the same as or slightly better than glass wool or rock wool.

Cellulose is very good at fitting around items in walls like pipes and wiring, leaving few air pockets that can reduce the overall efficiency of the wall. Dense pack cellulose can seal walls from air infiltration while providing the density to limit convection, when installed properly. The University of Colorado School of Architecture and Planning did a study that compared two seemingly identical test structures, one insulated with cellulose and the other with fiberglass. The cellulose insulation lost 26.4% less heat energy over time compared to the fiberglass insulation. It also was shown to tighten the structure more than 30%. Subsequent real world surveys have cellulose performing 20–30% better at reducing energy used for heating than fiberglass.

Compared to closed cell, Polyurethane foam insulation (R=5.5 to 6.5 per inch), cellulose has a lower R-value per inch, but is much less expensive; foam has a higher cost per equivalent R-value.

=== Long-term cost savings ===
Yearly savings from insulating vary widely and depend on several factors, including insulation thickness, original wall performance, local climate, heating/cooling use, airtightness of other building elements, and so on.

One installer claims cellulose insulation "can save homeowners 20 to 50 percent on their utility bills".

=== Sound insulation ===
Insulation reduces sound travelling through walls and between floor levels. Cellulose provides mass and damping. This reduces noise in two ways: it reduces the lateral vibration of sheetrock and attenuates the passage of sound along cavities. Cellulose is approximately three times denser than fiberglass, providing a slight improvement in sound reduction.

=== Mold and pest control ===
The borates in cellulose insulation provide added control against mold. Installations have shown that even several months of water saturation and improper installation did not result in mold.

It is a common misconception that the mere presence of crude borates in cellulose insulation provides pest control properties to the product. While boric acid itself does kill self-grooming insects if ingested, it must be presented to an insect in both sufficient concentration and in an ingestible form in order to achieve insect fatality. Proper testing of products containing borates must be performed in order to determine whether dosage and presentation are sufficient to kill insects. Once tested, registration with the EPA as a pesticide is required before a product may be advertised in the U.S. as having pesticidal effects.

=== Fire retardation ===
The borate treatment also gives cellulose the highest (Class I) fire safety rating. Many cellulose companies use a blend of ammonium sulfate and borate.

=== Vapor barrier ===
Building codes in most American cities require a vapor barrier or retarder on the inside of an exterior wall in order to prevent moisture from the warm interior from condensing inside the wall and causing mold or rot. However, many building officials will waive the requirement when a good reason is provided. In March, 2008, the city of Portland, Oregon, granted a waiver of the requirement for a vapor barrier or retarder when using cellulose insulation. This appeal cited industry guidance that the combination of an exterior vapor retarder (as required by code) and an interior one could trap moisture in the wall, leading to damage.

Recent studies have shown that even with a vapor retarder, excessive moisture can get into the wall by the movement of air around improperly sealed penetrations such as electrical outlets and can lights. A cellulose industry group argues that by filling the wall cavity completely, cellulose limits the flow of warm, humid air into the wall cavity and thus limits the amount of moisture accumulated to an amount that cellulose can manage without harm. In addition, cellulose acts to distribute moisture throughout the cavity, preventing the buildup of moisture in one area and helping to dry the moisture more quickly.

== Disadvantages ==
=== Dust ===
Cellulose contains small particles which can be blown into the house through inadequate seals around fixtures or small holes.

=== Installation expertise and building codes ===
Not all insulation installers are experienced with cellulose. Some installation considerations specific to cellulose include how to dense-pack loose-fill dry cellulose; how to apply stabilized (partly wet) on sloped surfaces, and the proper time required for wet-spray cellulose to dry.

Building codes concerning cellulose insulation may vary regionally, so local building officials should be consulted before planning an installation.

=== Slumping ===
If improperly installed, loose fill cellulose could settle after application. In some situations this could leave areas of wall uninsulated. With correct training in installation methods and quality control techniques this is ruled out by installing to tested densities preventing any future settlement.

=== Weight ===
For a given R-value, loose cellulose weighs roughly three times as much per square foot as loose fiberglass. Ceiling structures should be inspected for signs of weakness before choosing a material for insulating the ceilings of existing structures.

=== Offgassing ===
Many cellulose companies use a blend of ammonium sulfate and borate for fire retardation. Although ammonium sulfate is normally odorless, unexplained emission of ammonia and a resulting ammonia smell has been found in some cases.

=== Mold ===
There is some evidence of increased mold infestation inside buildings insulated with wet spray dense pack cellulose especially when used with a vapor barrier.

== Environmental properties ==
Insulation of any type helps make buildings more energy-efficient. Depending on the structure and manufacturer, using cellulose insulation could contribute to obtaining LEED credits from the US Green Building Council certification program.

=== Recycled content ===
Cellulose is composed of 75–85% recycled paper fiber, usually post-consumer waste newsprint. The other 15% is a fire retardant such as boric acid or ammonium sulphate. Cellulose has the highest recycled content of any insulation available. For example, fiberglass has a maximum amount of 50% recycled content.

=== Average toxicity and environmental impact of raw materials ===
Cellulose is considered a safe material because it contains only a minimal amount of added chemicals compared to many other insulation fibers. It does not emit volatile organic compounds(VOC) and is frequently awarded high-level indoor air quality certifications, such as M1 and NaturePlus. Many alternative insulation materials are unable to meet these same criteria.

=== Embodied energy ===
The embodied energy of cellulose insulation is the lowest of the popular insulation types. It requires 20 to 40 times as much energy to produce furnace-made insulation materials compared to cellulose. Cellulose is made by electrically powered machines while mineral insulation is made in fuel powered furnaces, reducing this advantage to a degree, as electricity generation is less than 50% efficient. Cellulose is made with locally available paper, while mineral insulation factories ship materials and products over greater distances.

Cellulose insulation uses borates for fire retardation. Borates are a non-renewable mined product; however, their overall impact remains small when considering the full picture. Cellulose insulation consistently replaces materials with significantly higher embodied emissions, which means that despite the use of borates, it ultimately has a net environmentally beneficial effect.

== See also ==
- Cellulose insulating material plant
