= Whirlwind mill =

A whirlwind mill is a beater mill for pulverising and micro-pulverising in process engineering.

== Construction ==
Whirlwind mills essentially consist of a mill base, a mill cover and a rotor. The inner side of the cover is equipped with wear protection elements. The top of the rotor is equipped with precrushing tools, and its side is covered with numerous U-shaped grinding tools.

== Function ==
The grinding stock is fed to the mill via an inlet box and is pre-crushed by the tools on top of the rotor. The precrushing tools also carry the product into the milling zone at the side of the rotor. There the grinding stock is fluidised in the air stream between rotor and stator caused by rotation and the U-shaped grinding tools. The special design of these tools creates massive air whirls in the grinding zone (this is where the name of the mill comes from). These air whirls cause the main grinding effect. The particles collide with each other in these whirlwinds. The final particle size can be adjusted by changing the clearance between rotor and stator, air flow and rotor speed.

== Applications ==
Whirlwind mills are basically used for pulverisation and micro-pulverisation of soft to medium hard products. In addition they can be used for cryogenic grinding, combined grinding/drying, combined drying/blending and defibration of organic substances (such as paper, cellulose, etc.). Whirlwind Mills can be found in different industries, such as chemical, plastic, building material, and food industry.

== Sources and external links ==
- Whirlwind mills: pictures and explanations
