= Greenhouse gas emissions from wetlands =

Source of gas emissions

A heat map of the planet showing methane emissions from wetlands from 1980 to 2021

Greenhouse gas emissions from wetlands of concern consist primarily of methane and nitrous oxide emissions. Wetlands are the largest natural source of atmospheric methane in the world, and are therefore a major area of concern with respect to climate change. Wetlands account for approximately 20–30% of atmospheric methane through emissions from soils and plants, and contribute an approximate average of 161 Tg of methane to the atmosphere per year.

Wetlands are characterized by water-logged soils and distinctive communities of plant and animal species that have adapted to the constant presence of water. This high level of water saturation creates conditions conducive to methane production. Most methanogenesis, or methane production, occurs in oxygen-poor environments. Because the microbes that live in warm, moist environments consume oxygen more rapidly than it can diffuse in from the atmosphere, wetlands are the ideal anaerobic environments for fermentation as well as methanogen activity. However, levels of methanogenesis fluctuates due to the availability of oxygen, soil temperature, and the composition of the soil. A warmer, more anaerobic environment with soil rich in organic matter would allow for more efficient methanogenesis.

Some wetlands are a significant source of methane emissions and some are also emitters of nitrous oxide. Nitrous oxide is a greenhouse gas with a global warming potential 300 times that of carbon dioxide and is the dominant ozone-depleting substance emitted in the 21st century. Wetlands can also act as a sink for greenhouse gases.

== Emissions by type of wetland ==
Characteristics of wetland classes can assist to inform on magnitude of methane emissions. However, wetland classes have displayed high variability in methane emissions spatially and temporally. Wetlands are often classified by landscape position, vegetation, and hydrologic regime. Wetland classes include marshes, swamps, bogs, fens, peatlands, muskegs, prairie pothole (landform), and pocosins.

== Amounts ==
Depending on their characteristics, some wetlands are a significant source of methane emissions and some are also emitters of nitrous oxide.

=== Methane ===
Wetlands account for approximately 20–30% of atmospheric methane through emissions from anoxic benthic sludge, soils and plants.

=== Nitrous oxide fluxes ===
Nitrous oxide is a greenhouse gas with a global warming potential 300 times that of carbon dioxide and is the dominant ozone-depleting substance emitted in the 21st century. Excess nutrients mainly from anthropogenic sources have been shown to significantly increase the N_{2}O fluxes from wetland soils through denitrification and nitrification processes (see table below). A study in the intertidal region of a New England salt marsh showed that excess levels of nutrients might increase N_{2}O emissions rather than sequester them.

Data on nitrous oxide fluxes from wetlands in the southern hemisphere are lacking, as are ecosystem-based studies including the role of dominant organisms that alter sediment biogeochemistry. Aquatic invertebrates produce ecologically-relevant nitrous oxide emissions due to ingestion of denitrifying bacteria that live within the subtidal sediment and water column and thus may also be influencing nitrous oxide production within some wetlands.

Nitrous oxide fluxes from different wetland soils (table adapted from Moseman-Valtierra (2012) and Chen et al. (2010))
Wetland type	Location	N_{2}O flux^{a} (μmol N_{2}O m^{−2} h^{−1})	Reference
Mangrove	Shenzhen and Hong Kong	0.14 to 23.83	
Mangrove	Muthupet, South India	0.41 to 0.77	
Mangrove	Bhitarkanika, East India	0.20 to 4.73	
Mangrove	Pichavaram, South India	0.89 to 1.89	
Mangrove	Queensland, Australia	−0.045 to 0.32	
Mangrove	South East Queensland, Australia	0.091 to 1.48	
Mangrove	Southwest coast, Puerto Rico	0.12 to 7.8	
Mangrove	Isla Magueyes, Puerto Rico	0.05 to 1.4	
Salt marsh	Chesapeake Bay, US	0.005 to 0.12	
Salt marsh	Maryland, US	0.1	
Salt marsh	North East China	0.1 to 0.16	
Salt marsh	Biebrza, Poland	−0.07 to 0.06	
Salt marsh	Netherlands	0.82 to 1.64	
Salt marsh	Baltic Sea	−0.13	
Salt marsh	Massachusetts, US	−2.14 to 1.27	

^{a}The flux rates are shown as hourly rates per unit area. A positive flux implies flux from soil into air; a negative flux implies flux from air into the soil. Negative N_{2}O fluxes are common and are caused by consumption by the soil.

== Pathways of methane emission ==
Wetlands deposit or accrete sediment and experience fluctuations in their water table, with some wetlands relying largely or solely on temporary surface water from precipitation rather than ground water. The level of the water table represents the boundary between anaerobic methane production and aerobic methane consumption. When the water table is low, the methane generated within the wetland soil has to come up through the soil and get past a deeper layer of methanotrophic bacteria, thereby reducing emission. Methane transport by vascular plants can bypass this aerobic layer, thus increasing emission.

Once produced, methane can reach the atmosphere via three main pathways: molecular diffusion, transport through plant aerenchyma, and ebullition. Primary productivity fuels methane emissions both directly and indirectly because plants not only provide much of the carbon needed for methane producing processes in wetlands but can affect its transport as well.

=== Fermentation ===
Fermentation is a process used by certain kinds of microorganisms to break down essential nutrients. In a process called acetoclastic methanogenesis, microorganisms from the classification domain archaea produce methane by fermenting acetate and H_{2}-CO_{2} into methane and carbon dioxide.

H_{3}C-COOH → CH_{4} + CO_{2}

Depending on the wetland and type of archaea, hydrogenotrophic methanogenesis, another process that yields methane, can also occur. This process occurs as a result of archaea oxidizing hydrogen with carbon dioxide to yield methane and water.

4H_{2} + CO_{2} → CH_{4} + 2H_{2}O

=== Diffusion ===
Diffusion through the profile refers to the movement of methane up through soil and bodies of water to reach the atmosphere. The importance of diffusion as a pathway varies per wetland based on the type of soil and vegetation. For example, in peatlands, the mass amount of dead, but not decaying, organic matter results in relatively slow diffusion of methane through the soil. Additionally, because methane can travel more quickly through soil than water, diffusion plays a much bigger role in wetlands with drier, more loosely compacted soil.

=== Aerenchyma ===
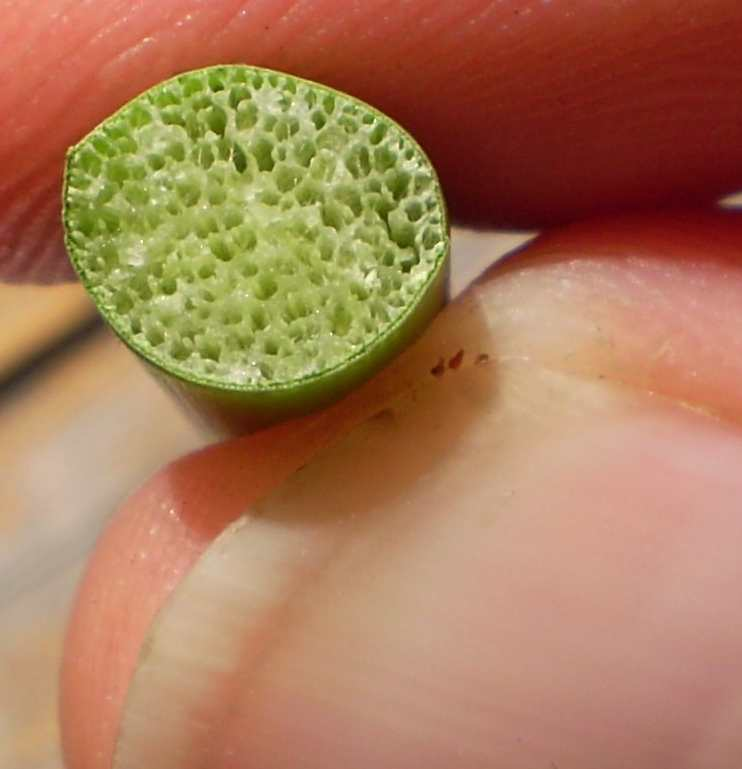
Plant-mediated methane flux through plant aerenchyma, shown here, can contribute 30–100% of the total methane flux from wetlands with emergent vegetation.

Plant aerenchyma refers to the vessel-like transport tubes within the tissues of certain kinds of plants. Plants with aerenchyma possess porous tissue that allows for direct travel of gases to and from the plant roots. Methane can travel directly up from the soil into the atmosphere using this transport system. The direct "shunt" created by the aerenchyma allows for methane to bypass oxidation by oxygen that is also transported by the plants to their roots.

=== Ebullition ===
Ebullition refers to the sudden release of bubbles of methane into the air. These bubbles occur as a result of aquatic methane building up over time in the soil, forming pockets of methane gas. As these pockets of trapped methane grow in size, the level of the soil will slowly rise up as well. This phenomenon continues until so much pressure builds up that the bubble "pops," transporting the aquatic methane up through the soil so quickly that it does not have time to be consumed by the methanotrophic organisms in the soil. With this release of gas, the level of soil then falls once more.

Ebullition in wetlands can be recorded by delicate sensors, called piezometers, that can detect the presence of pressure pockets within the soil. Hydraulic heads are also used to detect the subtle rising and falling of the soil as a result of pressure build up and release. Using piezometers and hydraulic heads, a study was done in northern United States peatlands to determine the significance of ebullition as a source of methane. Not only was it determined that ebullition is in fact a significant source of methane emissions in northern United States peatlands, but it was also observed that there was an increase in pressure after significant rainfall, suggesting that rainfall is directly related to aquatic methane emissions in wetlands.

== Controlling factors ==
The magnitude of methane emission from a wetland are usually measured using eddy covariance, gradient or chamber flux techniques, and depends upon several factors, including water table, comparative ratios of methanogenic bacteria to methanotrophic bacteria, transport mechanisms, temperature, substrate type, plant life, and climate. These factors work together to effect and control methane flux in wetlands.

Overall the main determinant of net flux of methane into the atmosphere is the ratio of methane produced by methanogenic bacteria that makes it to the surface relative to the amount of methane that is oxidized by methanotrophic bacteria before reaching the atmosphere. This ratio is in turn affected by the other controlling factors of methane in the environment. Additionally, pathways of methane emission affect how the methane travels into the atmosphere and thus have an equal effect on methane flux in wetlands.

=== Water table ===
The first controlling factor to consider is the level of the water table. Not only does pool and water table location determine the areas where methane production or oxidation may take place, but it also determines how quickly methane can diffuse into the air. When traveling through water, the methane molecules run into the quickly moving water molecules and thus take a longer time to reach the surface. Travel through soil, however, is much easier and results in easier diffusion into the atmosphere. This theory of movement is supported by observations made in wetlands where significant fluxes of methane occurred after a drop in the water table due to drought. If the water table is at or above the surface, then methane transport begins to take place primarily through ebullition and vascular or pressurized plant mediated transport, with high levels of emission occurring during the day from plants that use pressurized ventilation.

=== Temperature ===
Temperature is also an important factor to consider as the environmental temperature—and temperature of the soil in particular—affects the metabolic rate of production or consumption by bacteria. Additionally, because aquatic methane fluxes occur annually with the seasons, evidence is provided that suggests that the temperature changing coupled with water table level work together to cause and control the seasonal cycles.

=== Substrate composition ===
The composition of soil and substrate availability change the nutrients available for methanogenic and methanotrophic bacteria, and thus directly affects the rate of methane production and consumption. For example, wetlands soils with high levels of acetate or hydrogen and carbon dioxide are conducive to methane production. Additionally, the type of plant life and amount of plant decomposition affects the nutrients available to the bacteria as well as the acidity. Plant leachates such as phenolic compounds from Sphagnum can also interact with soil characteristics to influence methane production and consumption. A constant availability of cellulose and a soil pH of about 6.0 have been determined to provide optimum conditions for methane production and consumption; however, substrate quality can be overridden by other factors. Soil pH and composition must still be compared to the effects of water table and temperature.

=== Net ecosystem production ===
Net ecosystem production (NEP) and climate changes are the all encompassing factors that have been shown to have a direct relationship with methane emissions from wetlands. In wetlands with high water tables, NEP has been shown to increase and decrease with methane emissions, most likely due to the fact that both NEP and methane emissions flux with substrate availability and soil composition. In wetlands with lower water tables, the movement of oxygen in and out of the soil can increase the oxidation of methane and the inhibition of methanogenesis, nulling the relationship between methane emission and NEP because methane production becomes dependent upon factors deep within the soil.

A changing climate affects many factors within the ecosystem, including water table, temperature, and plant composition within the wetland—all factors that affect methane emissions. However, climate change can also affect the amount of carbon dioxide in the surrounding atmosphere, which would in turn decrease the addition of methane into the atmosphere, as shown by an 80% decrease in methane flux in areas of doubled carbon dioxide levels.

== Causes for additional emissions ==
=== Human development of wetlands ===
Humans often drain wetlands in the name of development, housing, and agriculture. By draining wetlands, the water table is thus lowered, increasing consumption of methane by the methanotrophic bacteria in the soil. However, as a result of draining, water saturated ditches develop, which due to the warm, moist environment, end up emitting a large amount of aquatic methane. Therefore, the actual effect on methane emission strongly ends up depending on several factors. If the drains are not spaced far enough apart, then saturated ditches will form, creating mini wetland environments. Additionally, if the water table is lowered significantly enough, then the wetland can actually be transformed from a source of methane into a sink that consumes methane. Finally, the actual composition of the original wetland changes how the surrounding environment is affected by the draining and human development.
