= Aquatic methane =

Methane formed and found in water

Aquatic methane is defined as biogenic methane (CH4) formed in water as a product of microbial activity during the decomposition of organic material under anaerobic conditions. To a lesser but important extent, aquatic methane is also a product of under water geological processes. Aquatic methane is produced, stored, and emitted within aquatic environments such as lakes and ponds, rivers, wetlands, reservoirs, and oceans. It is a major component of the global methane cycle and plays a significant role in climate change, ecosystem dynamics, and biogeochemical processes. Aquatic methane is a byproduct of methanogenesis, a form of anaerobic respiration where microbes called methanogens break down organic material for energy. Eutrophic and hypereutrophic aquatic ecosystems are responsible for 41% (median) or 53% (mean) of global methane emissions, much of it due to anthropogenic sources. Fall and Spring turnover results in a massive release of accumulated CH4 from benthic waters, due to thermal stratification.

== Overview ==
Methane is a simple hydrocarbon and a potent greenhouse gas with a global warming potential (GWP) approximately 28-34 times greater than carbon dioxide over a 100-year period Atmospheric methane concentrations have more than doubled since pre-industrial times due to natural and anthropogenic sources.

Aquatic ecosystems are estimated to contribute a large percentage of global methane emissions. Inland waters (including lakes, ponds, rivers, and reservoirs) emit about ~100–200 teragrams of aquatic methane per year (Tg C/yr), which represents roughly 10–30% of total global methane emissions.

== Sources and formation ==
=== Carbon isotopic signature ===
Carbon-12 (¹²C) and carbon-13 (¹³C) are both stable isotopes of carbon that differ in atomic mass, with ¹²C being more abundant in nature. Methanogens use a biological process known as methanogenesis, which prefers to use the lighter isotope (¹²C), resulting in isotopically "light" aquatic methane (depleted in ¹³C). This carbon isotope ratio is a signature commonly used to identify biogenic methane (aquatic methane) originating from aquatic systems.

In aquatic environments, methane produced by methanogens in anoxic sediments typically exhibits low ¹³C concentrations, which distinguishes it from thermogenic or geologic methane sources, which generally produce higher concentrations of the ¹³C isotope. The isotopic ratio of ¹²C/¹³C allows researchers to trace the methane to its source, where biological activity can influence the carbon isotope ratio.

=== Biological production ===
Aquatic methane is primarily produced by microorganisms known as methanogens. These anaerobic archaea and bacteria produce methane through anaerobic digestion of organic matter in sediments and in water columns where oxygen is absent.

Methanogenesis occurs under oxygen-depleted conditions and is especially active in wetlands and marshes ("marsh gas"), lakes, ponds, and reservoir sediments, flooded soils, and organic-rich environments.

Globally, these sources contribute approximately 150–200 Tg C/yr, making it the largest methane source.

Aquatic methane production rates increase with temperature (often doubling with a 10°C increase in some systems), availability of organic carbon, nutrient loading from runoff, decreased dissolved oxygen, and the composition of the microbes in the environment.

=== Geological sources ===
Aquatic methane can also originate from geological sources and processes. Methane hydrates (clathrates) are stored in sediments, storing an estimated thousands of gigatons of carbon, globally. Thermogenic aquatic methane emissions are released from deep oceanic seeps and from within Earth's crust. Permafrost and Arctic systems during thawing will also release aquatic methane due to increasing global temperatures.

~1% of methane released from the seafloor from Earth's crust and oceanic seeps makes it into the atmosphere. The destabilization of methane hydrates due to oceanic temperature increase can lead to large aquatic methane releases An estimated 473 Tg of aquatic methane from hydrates have been released into the water column over the course of 100 years. By the year 2100, methane clathrates will not be a major source of oceanic aquatic methane due to their decreasing numbers.

Geologic sources of aquatic methane can be very sensitive to climate warming and may act as positive feedback mechanisms.

=== Emission pathways ===
Methane is released from aquatic systems through three primary pathways:

1. Ebullition (bubble formation): Aquatic methane forms bubbles in sediments that rise to the surface and release into the atmosphere. Ebullition accounts for 50-90% of methane emitted from aquatic systems
2. Diffusion: Dissolved aquatic methane continuously diffuses into the atmosphere from surface waters
3. Plant-mediated transport: Aquatic-bound vascular plants transport aquatic methane and other dissolved gases through porous aerenchyma tissues, into the atmosphere.

Aquatic methane's main emission pathway is ebullition, which is enhanced in aquatic systems that have excessive organic matter buildup within the sediment.

== Contribution by aquatic systems ==
=== Lakes and ponds ===
Lakes and ponds are major sources of aquatic methane emissions due to stratification and increased accumulation of organic matter. These inland waters account for 40.6% of the total anthropogenically caused atmospheric methane. Lakes and ponds are estimated to emit ~40–80 Tg C/yr globally, with some estimates as high as 583 Tg C/yr.

Lakes account for the release of 41.6 +/- 18.3 Tg C/yr. Ebullition pathways in lakes account for 23.4 Tg C/yr. Diffusive emissions from lakes account for 14.1 Tg C/yr.

Small ponds, despite their size, can contribute disproportionately to aquatic methane emissions due to increased sedimentation and frequent ebullition in anoxic conditions. Small aquatic systems' methane emissions are highly variable Stormwater ponds designed to trap sediment are a large source of aquatic methane emissions. One study's results concluded aquatic methane emissions were 5 g aquatic methane m^{-2}y^{-1}. Another study concludes that aquatic methane emissions from stormwater infrastructure have higher average emissions than conventional water treatment plants, which can emit up to 7 times more aquatic methane.

=== Rivers and streams ===
Rivers and streams emit ~27.9 (16.7-39.7) Tg C/yr, often caused by nutrient inputs from surrounding agricultural, groundwater, wastewater and urban runoff.

=== Reservoirs ===
Hydroelectric reservoirs are a significant anthropogenic source of aquatic methane. Global reservoir aquatic methane emissions are estimated to be ~10-18.7 Tg C/yr. An estimated 11 ± 4 Tg C/yr is released into the atmosphere from reservoir degassing and 2.8 ± 0.2 Tg C/yr emissions released from reservoir surfaces through diffusion and ebullition.

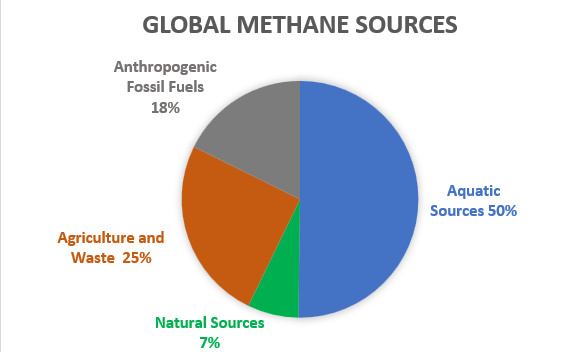
Updated data on the sources of global methane emissions, as of 2021.

Water released from anoxic benthic zones to produce mechanical energy from turbine movement, fluctuating water levels, and nutrient and organic matter inputs from flooding and anthropogenic sources are other contributing factors of reservoir aquatic methane emissions.

=== Oceans ===
Oceans contribute a smaller but important amount of aquatic methane emissions, estimated at ~5–20 Tg C/yr. These aquatic methane emissions are emitted mostly from coastal areas and continental margins as well as geological formations/processes.

== Environmental factors ==
=== Trophic state and algal blooms ===
Excessive nutrient loading from urban, agricultural, and sewage runoff can lead to aquatic methane emissions through the increase of excessive aquatic vegetation in a water body. Nutrient enrichment can also result in harmful algal blooms (HABs), which can further increase methane emissions from excessive sedimentary organic matter deposition in a water body. This process is called eutrophication, which can result in the release of significantly more tonnes of aquatic methane than an oligotrophic system. A water body's trophic status can directly correlate in a non-linear model with total aquatic methane emissions.

==== Link to trophic state ====
===== Oligotrophic =====
Low biological productivity, generally having clear water and great water quality due to minimal anthropogenic pollutant input. Aquatic methane emissions from oligotrophic water are ~0.9 mg/m2/day.

===== Mesotrophic =====
Moderate levels of biological productivity, generally with fair water quality and clarity. Mesotrophic water generally can emit about 4.9 mg/m2/day.

===== Eutrophic =====
High levels of biological productivity, usually with poor water quality. Eutrophic waters can experience frequent algal blooms, leading to elevated aquatic methane emissions of ~58 mg/m2/day

===== Hypereutrophic =====
Extremely nutrient-rich, supporting large amounts of aquatic vegetation. Frequent algal blooms can occur, causing low visibility and elevated aquatic methane emissions ~1671 mg/m2/day.

=== Temperature and Stratification ===
Warmer temperatures can boost microbial activity, with one study suggesting the increase of aquatic methane emissions by 11% per 1 °C. Stratified lakes have distinct thermal layers that can trap dissolved gases, including aquatic methane, in deep cold waters (hypolimnion). Seasonal mixing events release benthic aquatic methane and other trapped gases. The mixing events generally occur during the Fall and Spring turnover, resulting in a massive release of accumulated aquatic methane from benthic waters. One study observed a Fall turnover release of ~1.0 Tg C/yr, and a Spring turnover release of 3.1 Tg C/yr.

=== Oxygen availability ===
Anaerobic aquatic environments support the proliferation of methanogens, anaerobic archaea, that undergo the process of methanogenesis, producing aquatic methane (CH_{4}) from hydrogen (H_{2}) and carbon dioxide (CO_{2}), formate (CHO_{2}^{-}), methanol (CH_{3}OH), acetate (C_{2}H_{3}O_{2}^{-}) and methylamines (CH_{3}NH_{2}). Anaerobic oxidation of methane (AOM) by methanotrophs can occur within anoxic sediments. Aquatic methane oxidation efficiency increases nearly 10-fold when oxygen is present within a system.

Oxygen-rich environments support methanotrophs, which oxidize aquatic methane, producing carbon dioxide (CO_{2}). Methanotrophic microbes can survive and oxidize aquatic methane in hypoxic environments with extremely low dissolved oxygen concentrations.

=== Consumption ===
Aquatic methane can be consumed by methanotrophs, bacteria and archaea that oxidize methane into carbon dioxide. This process acts as a biological filter in aquatic systems. About 30-97% of produced aquatic methane can be oxidized depending on dissolved oxygen availability and stratification. Methane oxidation due to biological action accounts for on average, 80-90% of methane oxidation from freshwater (lakes and ponds) and marine systems, with some studies resulting in aquatic methane oxidation of up to 97%. Aquatic methane oxidation due to methanotrophy has been observed at 66% from groundwater [64], 78.1% in coastal waters, and ~43% average from wetland marshes.

Methanotrophy can occur in oxygenated surface waters [61][62], at the sediment-water interfaces when oxygen is available, and in stratified waterbodies where oxygen gradients exist.ref name=":14" />

=== Climate impact ===
Aquatic methane emissions contribute a median of 41% and a mean of 53% to total global methane sources, which significantly affects climate change. Methane is a potent greenhouse gas, with a global warming potential (GWP) of 27-30 times CO2 over 100 years, and a GWP of 80-86 times CO2 over 20 years.

Methane is responsible for approximately 20–30% of current global warming, while 12% to15% of total planetary warming is attributed to aquatic methane emissions (percent calculations derived from).

== Extreme events ==
=== Limnic eruption ===
Aquatic methane and other gases can saturate water in high concentrations within deep lakes, and suddenly release in a limnic eruption, which can pose extreme risks to nearby organisms. These gases, including aquatic methane (now in gaseous form), form a dense gas cloud that can displace oxygen, which has historically caused asphyxiation and death of humans and livestock, near Lake Nyos in Cameroon, West Africa.

Lake Kivu is at risk of having the same outcome due to high concentrations of aquatic methane accumulating deep within the lake. From 1974 to 2004, aquatic methane concentration increased by 15-20%. The increase of aquatic methane in Lake Kivu is due to volcanic activity beneath the lake, and biogenic aquatic methane production from anthropogenic input producing excessive organic matter deposition.

=== Mass extinction links ===
Large-scale aquatic methane releases have been hypothesized as contributing factors in historical events such as the Permian-Triassic extinction event (~252 million years ago). The over-abundance of aquatic methane emissions was potentially due to rapid climate warming, and the evolution of methanogenesis within the methanogenic microbial genus, Methanosarcina.

== Human health and monitoring ==
Aquatic methane is not considered toxic. When aquatic methane is highly concentrated, it can pose significant risks due to explosion potential within confined spaces, and whole lake limnic eruptions.

=== Measurement and monitoring ===
Aquatic methane can be measured using flux chambers, hyroacoustics, funnel gas traps, satellite observations (GOSAT, MethaneSAT), and direct water sampling for gas chromatography analysis.

Modern research is currently focused on improving aquatic methane quantification in reservoirs and natural systems to better estimate the total global methane emissions.

== See also ==
- Methane cycle
- Carbon cycle
- Greenhouse gas
- Limnology
