= Marsh gas =

Gas produced naturally within marshes, swamps and bogs

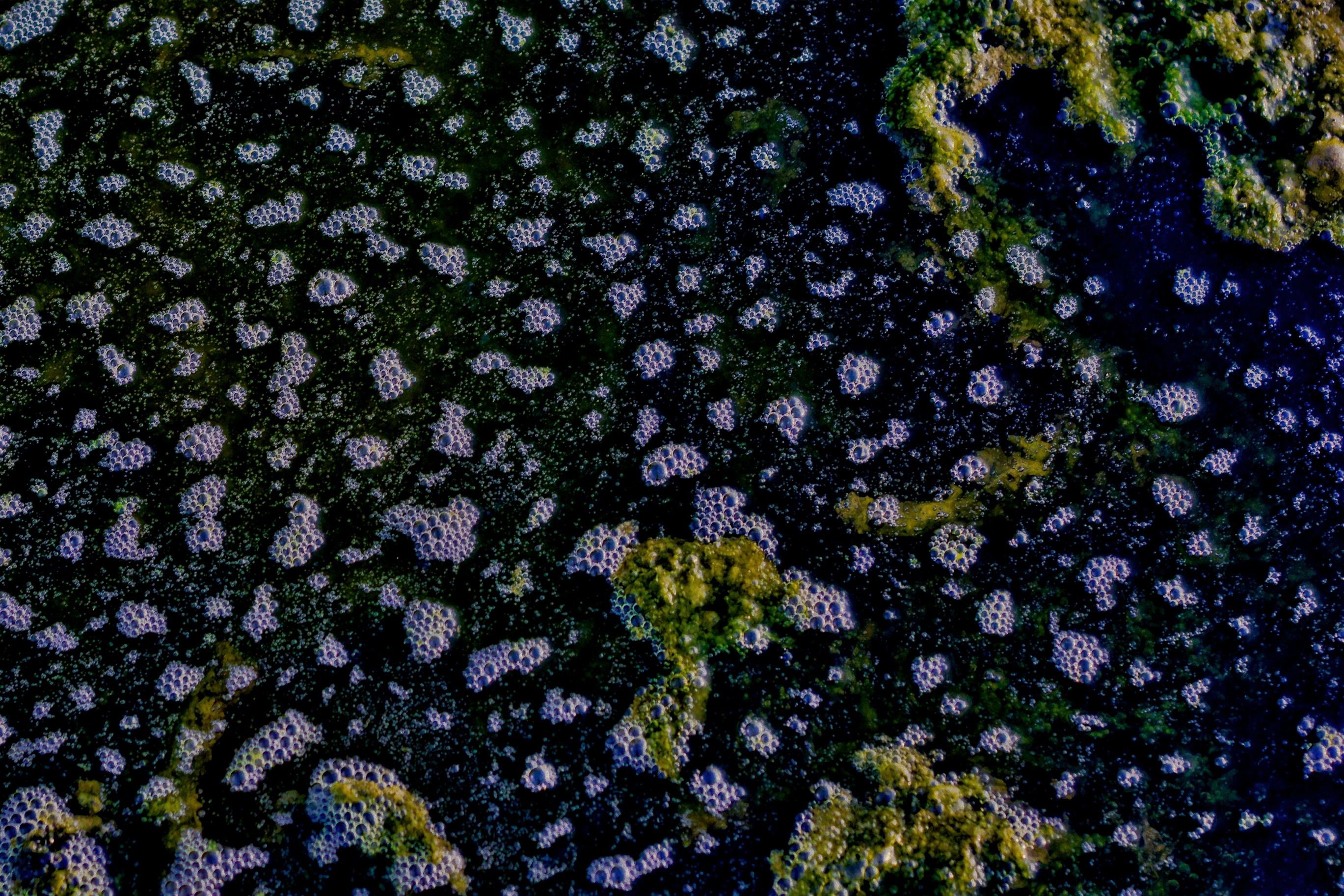
Bubbles of methane, created by methanogens, that are present in the marsh, more commonly known as marsh gas.

Marsh gas, also known as swamp gas or bog gas, is a mixture primarily of methane and smaller amounts of hydrogen sulfide, carbon dioxide, and trace phosphine that is produced naturally within some geographical marshes, swamps, and bogs.

The surface of marshes, swamps, and bogs is initially porous vegetation that rots to form a crust that prevents oxygen from reaching the organic material trapped below. That is the condition that allows anaerobic digestion and fermentation of any plant or animal matter, which then produces methane.

The trapped methane can escape through any of three main pathways: by the diffusion of methane molecules across an air–water interface, by bubbling out of water in a process known as ebullition, or through plant-mediated transport.

== Methane formation ==
Methane is the primary gas that makes up the product colloquially known as "marsh gas". Much of the biogenic methane produced in nature is derived from either acetate cleavage or by the hydrogen reduction of carbon dioxide. Methane can also be produced by methanogens, archaea that produce methane under anoxic conditions, in a process known as methanogenesis. Methanogens generate Methanosarcina which are common in marsh environments. They are both known for stimulating methane production in aquatic muds and using acetate, methanol, and trimethylamine as substrates for methane production.

== Escape routes ==
Global wetlands are one of the largest sources of atmospheric methane. This methane, which is produced by the decomposition of organic matter in an anoxic environment, escapes through either diffusion, a process that occurs mostly at night, ebullition, or plant-mediated transportation.

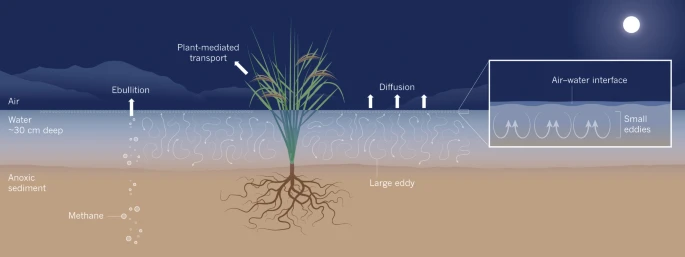
Methane gas escaping via three routes: ebullition (bubbling), plant-mediated transport, and diffusion.

The diffusive process is controlled by the passage of gas across the air–water interface. The diffusion can be accelerated and intensified by upwelling, such as the motion from turbulent eddies, and cooling processes. At night, heat is emitted from the water surface by radiation. The colder surface water sinks, pushing the warmer surface water out and forming eddies. These eddies circulate the dissolved methane throughout the water column and increase the methane flux to the atmosphere. This process is called hydrodynamic transport, and it accounts for more than half of nighttime methane fluxes as well as 32% of annual methane emissions from wetland environments.

Ebullition, also known as bubbling, is a type of one-way transport of gases from nutrient rich sediments, to the water column, and then to the atmosphere. It is a major mechanism for gas exchange in freshwater and coastal marine ecosystems and is known to peak during the daytime and at warm temperatures. It has been reported that ebullition is responsible for 45% of the annual methane flux for fresh water marshes and that it is more important in the summer months during the daytime and can also be triggered by increased wind.

One of the most common species of grass in marsh environments is Spartina. These spartina and other common marsh grasses use a gas transport system found in the stems and roots of the plants. The gas transport system works by gaseous diffusion that occurs through the leaf blades and then moves down into the furthest tips of the plant roots. This transport system is sufficient to supply all of the aerobic respiratory needs of the grass roots and also helps to aerate the surrounding mud.

== See also ==
- Anoxic waters
- Firedamp, produced naturally in coal mines
- Hydric soil
- Landfill gas, produced incidentally where municipal solid waste is abandoned.
- Michigan "swamp gas" UFO reports
- Natural gas
- Sewer gas
- Wetland methane emissions
- Will-o'-the-wisp, mysterious lights caused by ignition of methane and other gases
