= Coalbed methane extraction =

Method for extracting methane from a coal deposit

Coalbed methane extraction (CBM extraction) is a method for extracting methane from a coal deposit. Coal bed methane (CBM) is one of the factors restricting the safe production of coal in underground coal mines. It is also a form of high-quality energy that can be used in many fields such as power generation, heating, and chemical industries. CBM extraction is therefore carried out before extraction with a view of increasing the safety of mining coal beds, and as a useful energy resource to be exploited.

== Basic principles ==
Methane adsorbed into a solid coal matrix (coal macerals) will be released if the coal seam is depressurized. Methane may be extracted by drilling wells into the coal seam. The goal is to decrease the water pressure by pumping water from the well. The decrease in pressure allows methane to desorb from the coal and flow as a gas up the well to the surface. Methane is then compressed and piped to market.

The objective is to avoid putting methane into the water line but allow it to flow up the backside of the well (casing) to the compressor station. If the water level is pumped too low during dewatering, methane may travel up the tubing into the water line causing the well to become "gassy". Although methane may be recovered in a water-gas separator at the surface, pumping water and gas is inefficient and can cause pump wear and breakdown.

== Areas with CBM extraction ==
Tens of thousands of methane wells have been drilled, and extensive support facilities such as roads, pipelines, and compressors have been installed for CBM extraction in the Powder River Basin of northeast Wyoming and southeast Montana and now in India at West Bengal- Ranigunj, Panagarh, etc. Seven percent of the natural gas (methane) currently produced in the United States comes from CBM extraction. Methane from coalbed reservoirs can be recovered economically, but disposal of water is an environmental concern.

There are also sites in Central Scotland at Letham Moss.

Most gas in coal is stored on the internal surfaces of organic matter. Because of its large internal surface area, coal stores 6 to 7 times more gas than the equivalent rock volume of a conventional gas reservoir. Gas content generally increases with coal rank, with depth of burial of the coal bed, and with reservoir pressure. Fractures, or cleats, within coal beds, are usually filled with water. Deeper coal beds contain less water, but that water is more saline. Removing water from the coal bed reduces pressure and releases methane. Large amounts of water, sometimes saline brine, are produced from coalbed methane wells. The greatest water volumes are produced during the early stages of production. Environmentally acceptable disposal of brine is a major cost factor for economic methane production. Fresh water may be discharged on the surface, but the brine is usually injected into the rock at a depth where the salinity of the injected brine is less than the connate fluids of the host rock. Evaporation of water for recovery of potentially salable solid residues might be feasible in regions having high evaporation rates.

== Measuring the gas content of coal ==
Coal bed gas content measurements are commonly used in mine safety as well as coal bed methane resource assessment and recovery applications. Gas content determination techniques generally fall into two categories: (1) direct methods which measure the volume of methane released from a coal sample sealed into a desorption canister and (2) indirect methods based on empirical correlations, or laboratory-derived sorption isotherm methane storage capacity data. Laboratory sorption isotherms provide information about the storage capacity of a coal sample if these are measured under geological realistic pressure and temperature conditions. Thus, the maximum gas content that can be expected for methane recovery can be assessed from such laboratory isotherm measurements.

The total gas content by the indirect methods is based on the empirical formula given by Meisner and Kim. The quantity of gas is determined by the Meisner and Kim formula using the moisture content, volatile content, the volume of methane adsorbed on wet coal, fixed carbon, thickness of coal, and temperature.
Meisner (1984) observed that the amount of methane gas (VCH4) is related to volatile matter (daf).

V_{CH4} = −325.6 × log (V.M/37.8)

The estimation of the in situ gas content of the coal will be evaluated by using Kim's (Kim 1977) equation

V = (100 −M − A) /100 × [ Vw /Vd ] [K(P)^{N} - (b × T)]
Where,
V = Volume of methane gas adsorbed (cc/g)
M = Moisture content (%)
A = Ash content (%).
Vw/Vd = 1/(0.25 ×M + 1)
Vw = Volume of gas adsorbed on wet coal (cc/g)
Vd = Volume of gas adsorbed on dry coal (cc/g)
The values of K and N depend on the rank of the coal and can be expressed in terms of the ratio of fixed carbon (FC) to Volatile matter(VM)
K = 0.8 (F.C /V.M) + 5.6 Where
F.C = Fixed carbon (%)
VM = Volatile matter (%)
N = Composition of coal (for most bituminous coals, N = (0.39 - 0.013 × K)
b =Adsorption constant due to temperature change (cc/g/◦C).
T = Geothermal Gradient × (h/ 100) + To
T = Temperature at a given depth
To = Ground temperature
h = Depth (m)

Estimation of methane content in coal seams by Karol curve

In the absence of measured methane content of coal beds, and production data from coal bed methane wells, gas content can be estimated using the Eddy curve. Eddy and others constructed a series of curves estimating the maximum producible methane content of coal beds as a function of depth and rank.
The estimation of the methane content of a coal bed is determined from the Eddy curve by locating the average depth of each coal seam on the depth axis. A normal line is extended upward from the depth axis (feet) to intersect the specific coal rank curves. A line from the point on the curve is extended normally to the lost and desorbed gas axis (cm^{3}/gm). The intersection of the line and the axis is the estimated methane content of the coal seam.

== Interpretation of Ash analysis ==
Ash is an important indicator of clastic input, derived from marine or fluvial deposition of clay, silt, and sand during peat development. Outcrop ash content appears to be less than the ash content of subsurface samples. Lower ash contents of outcrop samples may be due to coal deposits being up-dip and further away from a marine influence than samples down-dip.

== See also ==
- Coalbed methane
- Enhanced coal bed methane recovery
