= Enhanced coal bed methane recovery =

Enhanced coal bed methane recovery is a method of producing additional coalbed methane from a source rock, similar to enhanced oil recovery applied to oil fields. Carbon dioxide (CO_{2}) injected into a bituminous coal bed would occupy pore space and also adsorb onto the carbon in the coal at approximately twice the rate of methane (CH_{4}), allowing for potential enhanced gas recovery. This technique may be used in conjunction with carbon capture and storage in mitigation of global warming where the carbon dioxide that is sequestered is captured from the output of fossil fuel power plants.

A research project at ETH Zurich is studying the process of pumping carbon dioxide into unminable coal seams and recovering the methane that is subsequently displaced.

An extensive experimental investigation about the process of desorbing methane by adsorbing carbon dioxide in real coal samples was performed. The proof of principle and the technical feasibility of the method could be verified with these measurements. These research results indicate that CBM can become an alternative to conventional natural gas. ECBM provides additional to CBM the advantage of long-term CO_{2} storage in the underground coal seams.

However, without other incentives, enhanced coal bed methane recovery is not economical as the commercial value of the released methane does not completely offset the cost of pumping.

Penetration of CO_{2} into coal is simulated using a stress-enhanced diffusion model.

== See also ==
- Coal bed methane extraction
- Global Methane Initiative
