= Methane =

Hydrocarbon compound (CH4) in natural gas

- Stereo, skeletal formula of methane with some measurements added

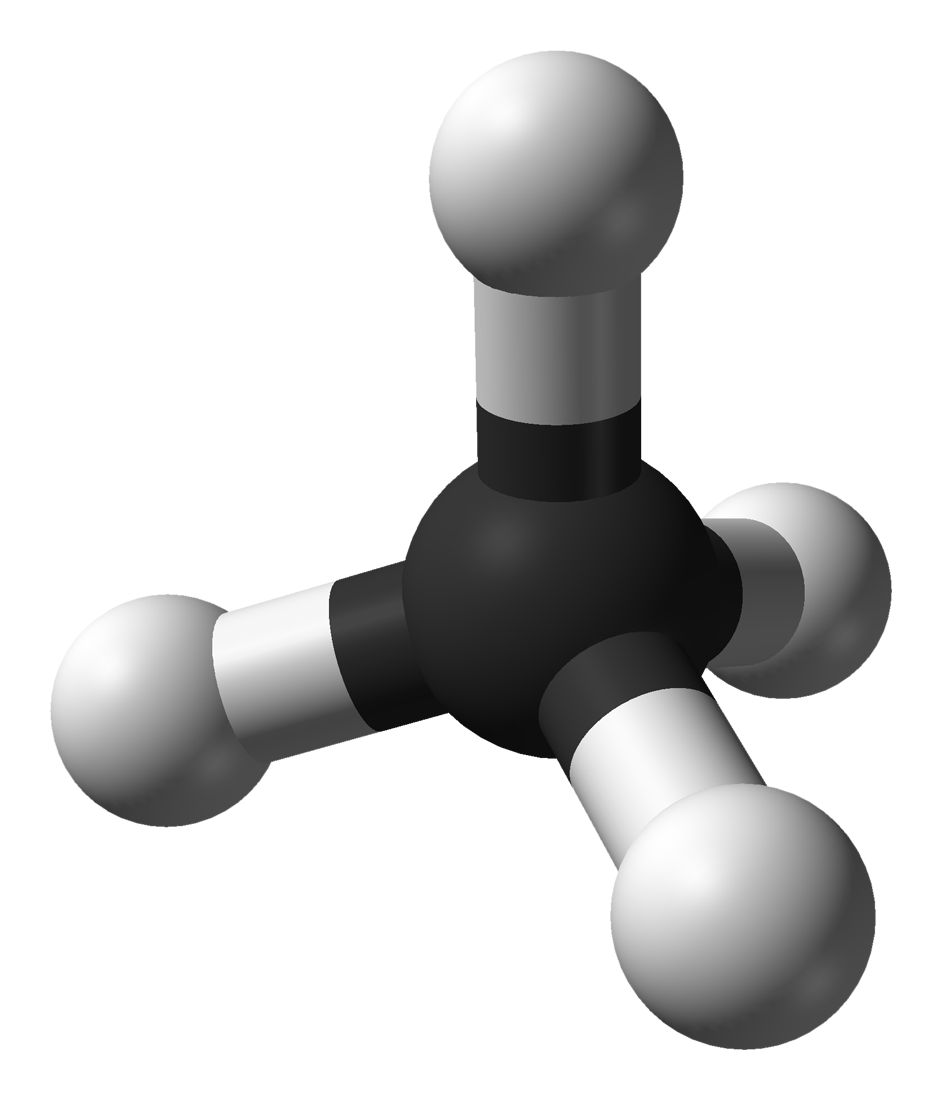
Ball and stick model of methane
Spacefill model of methane
Carbon, C
Hydrogen, H

Names
- Preferred IUPAC name Methane
- Systematic IUPAC name Carbane (never recommended)
- Other names: Carbon tetrahydride; Carburetted hydrogen; Hydrogen carbide; Marsh gas; Methyl hydride; Natural gas

Identifiers
CAS Number	74-82-8
3D model (JSmol)	Interactive image
Beilstein Reference	1718732
ChEBI	CHEBI:16183
ChEMBL	ChEMBL17564
ChemSpider	291
ECHA InfoCard	100.000.739
EC Number	200-812-7
Gmelin Reference	59
KEGG	C01438
MeSH	Methane
PubChem CID	297
RTECS number	PA1490000
UNII	OP0UW79H66
UN number	1971
CompTox Dashboard (EPA)	DTXSID8025545
- InChI: InChI=1S/CH4/h1H4 Key: VNWKTOKETHGBQD-UHFFFAOYSA-N
- SMILES: C

Properties
Chemical formula	CH_{4}
Molar mass	16.043 g·mol^{−1}
Appearance	Colorless gas
Odor	Odorless
Density	0.657 kg/m^{3} (gas, 25 °C, 1 atm); 0.717 kg/m^{3} (gas, 0 °C, 1 atm); 422.8 g/L (liquid, −162 °C)
Melting point	−182.456 °C (−296.421 °F; 90.694 K)
Boiling point	−161.49 °C (−258.68 °F; 111.66 K)
Critical point (T, P)	190.56 K (−82.59 °C; −116.66 °F), 4.5992 MPa (45.391 atm)
Solubility in water	22.7 mg/L
Solubility	Soluble in ethanol, diethyl ether, benzene, toluene, methanol, acetone and insoluble in water
log P	1.09
Henry's law constant (k_{H})	14 nmol/(Pa·kg)
Conjugate acid	Methanium
Conjugate base	Methyl anion
Magnetic susceptibility (χ)	−17.4×10^{−6} cm^{3}/mol

Structure
Point group	T_{d}
Molecular shape	Tetrahedral at carbon atom
Dipole moment	0 D

Thermochemistry
Heat capacity (C)	35.7 J/(K·mol)
Std molar entropy (S^{⦵}_{298})	186.3 J/(K·mol)
Std enthalpy of formation (Δ_{f}H^{⦵}_{298})	−74.6 kJ/mol
Gibbs free energy (Δ_{f}G^{⦵})	−50.5 kJ/mol
Std enthalpy of combustion (Δ_{c}H^{⦵}_{298})	−891 kJ/mol

Hazards
- GHS labelling
Pictograms	(GHS02: Flammable)
Signal word	Danger
Hazard statements	H220
Precautionary statements	P210
NFPA 704 (fire diamond)	2 4 0 SA
Flash point	−188 °C (−306.4 °F; 85.1 K)
Autoignition temperature	537 °C (999 °F; 810 K)
Explosive limits	4.4–17%

Related compounds
Related alkanes	Ethane; Propane; Butane
Related compounds	Silane; Germane; Stannane; Plumbane

Supplementary data page
- Methane (data page)
- Except where otherwise noted, data are given for materials in their standard state (at 25 °C [77 °F], 100 kPa). verify (what is ?) Infobox references

Methane (US: /ˈmɛθeɪn/ METH-ayn, UK: /ˈmiːθeɪn/ MEE-thayn) is a chemical compound that has the chemical formula CH_{4} (one carbon atom bonded to four hydrogen atoms). It is a group-14 hydride, the simplest alkane, and the main constituent of natural gas. The abundance of methane on Earth makes it an economically attractive fuel, although capturing and storing it is difficult because it is a gas at standard temperature and pressure. In the Earth's atmosphere methane is transparent to visible light but absorbs infrared radiation, acting as a greenhouse gas. Methane is an organic hydrocarbon, and among the simplest of organic compounds.

Naturally occurring methane is found both below ground and under the seafloor and is formed by both geological and biological processes. The largest reservoir of methane is under the seafloor in the form of methane clathrates. When methane reaches the surface and the atmosphere, it is known as atmospheric methane.

Methane has also been detected on other planets, including Mars, which has implications for astrobiology research.

== Properties and bonding ==
Covalently bonded hydrogen and carbon in a molecule of methane.

Methane is a tetrahedral molecule with four equivalent C–H bonds. Its electronic structure is described by two bonding molecular orbitals (MOs) resulting from the overlap of the valence orbitals on C and H. The lowest-energy MO is the result of the overlap of the 2s orbital on carbon with the in-phase combination of the 1s orbitals on the four hydrogen atoms. Above this energy level is a triply degenerate MO that overlaps with various linear combinations of the 1s orbitals on hydrogen atom. The resulting "three-over-one" bonding scheme is consistent with photoelectron spectroscopic measurements.

Methane is an odorless, colourless and transparent gas at standard temperature and pressure. It does absorb visible light, especially at the red end of the spectrum, due to overtone bands, but the effect is only noticeable if the light path is very long. This is what gives Uranus and Neptune their blue or bluish-green colors, as light passes through their atmospheres containing methane and is then scattered back out.

The familiar smell of natural gas as used in homes is achieved by the addition of an odorant, usually blends containing tert-butylthiol, as a safety measure. Methane has a boiling point of −161.5 °C at a pressure of one atmosphere. As a gas, it is flammable over a range of concentrations (5.4%–17%) in air at standard pressure.

Solid methane exists in several modifications, of which nine are known. Cooling methane at normal pressure results in the formation of methane I. This substance crystallizes in the cubic system (space group Fm3̅m). The positions of the hydrogen atoms are not fixed in methane I, i.e. methane molecules may rotate freely. Therefore, it is a plastic crystal.

== Chemical reactions ==
The primary chemical reactions of methane are combustion, steam reforming to syngas, and halogenation. In general, methane reactions are difficult to control.

=== Acid–base reactions ===
Like other hydrocarbons, methane is an extremely weak acid. Its pK_{a} in DMSO is estimated to be 56. It cannot be deprotonated in solution, but the conjugate base is known in forms such as methyllithium.

A variety of positive ions derived from methane have been observed, mostly as unstable species in low-pressure gas mixtures. These include methenium or methyl cation CH_{3}^{+}, methane cation CH_{4}^{+}, and methanium or protonated methane CH_{5}^{+}. Some of these have been detected in outer space. Methanium can also be produced as diluted solutions from methane with superacids. Cations with higher charge, such as CH_{6}^{2+} and CH_{7}^{3+}, have been studied theoretically and conjectured to be stable.

Despite the strength of its C–H bonds, there is intense interest in catalysts that facilitate C–H bond activation in methane (and other lower numbered alkanes).

=== Oxidation ===
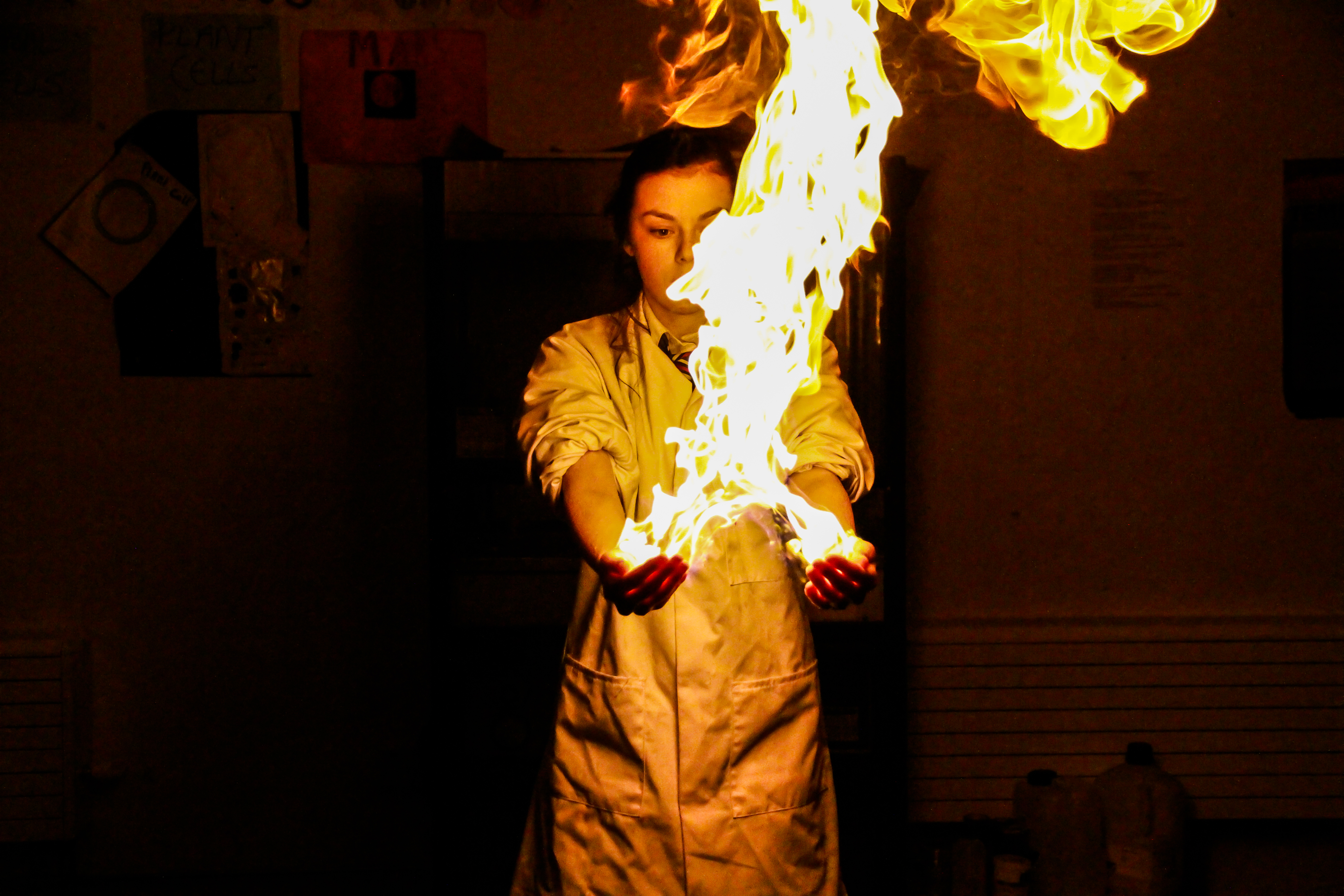
Methane bubbles can be burned on a wet hand without injury.

Methane's heat of combustion is 55.5 MJ/kg. Combustion of methane is a multiple step reaction summarized as follows:

CH_{4} + 2 O_{2} → CO_{2} + 2 H_{2}O
Δ_{c}H = −891 kJ/mol, at standard conditions (liquid water is formed at standard conditions, Δ_{c}H = −802 kJ/mol if water vapor formation is considered)

Peters four-step chemistry is a systematically reduced four-step chemistry that explains the burning of methane.

Partial oxidation (combustion) of methane to methanol (CH_{3}OH) in effected by some enzymes. The enzymes methane monooxygenase produces methanol from methane. One group of bacteria catalyze methane oxidation with nitrite as the oxidant in the absence of oxygen, giving rise to the so-called anaerobic oxidation of methane.

Industrial scale oxidation has never achieved commercial success, even with an insufficient supply of oxygen. Some homogeneously catalyzed systems and heterogeneous systems have been demonstrated, but no such processes has proven economical. These generally operate by generating protected products which are shielded from overoxidation. Examples include the Catalytica system, copper zeolites, and iron zeolites stabilizing the alpha-oxygen active site.

=== Methane radical reactions ===
Given appropriate conditions, methane reacts with halogen radicals as follows:

•X + CH_{4} → HX + •CH_{3}
•CH_{3} + X_{2} → CH_{3}X + •X

where X is a halogen: fluorine (F), chlorine (Cl), bromine (Br), or iodine (I). This mechanism for this process is called free radical halogenation. It is initiated when UV light or some other radical initiator (like peroxides) produces a halogen atom. A two-step chain reaction ensues in which the halogen atom abstracts a hydrogen atom from a methane molecule, resulting in the formation of a hydrogen halide molecule and a methyl radical (•CH_{3}). The methyl radical then reacts with a molecule of the halogen to form a molecule of the halomethane, with a new halogen atom as byproduct. Similar reactions can occur on the halogenated product, leading to replacement of additional hydrogen atoms by halogen atoms with dihalomethane, trihalomethane, and ultimately, tetrahalomethane structures, depending upon reaction conditions and the halogen-to-methane ratio.

This reaction is commonly used with chlorine to produce dichloromethane and chloroform via chloromethane. Carbon tetrachloride can be made with excess chlorine.

== Uses ==
Methane may be transported as a refrigerated liquid (liquefied natural gas, or LNG). While leaks from a refrigerated liquid container are initially heavier than air due to the increased density of the cold gas, the gas at ambient temperature is lighter than air. Gas pipelines distribute large amounts of natural gas, of which methane is the principal component.

=== Fuel ===
Methane is used as a fuel for ovens, homes, water heaters, kilns, automobiles, rockets, turbines, etc.

As the major constituent of natural gas, methane is important for electricity generation by burning it as a fuel in a gas turbine or steam generator. Compared to other hydrocarbon fuels, methane produces less carbon dioxide for each unit of heat released. At about 891 kJ/mol, methane's heat of combustion is lower than that of any other hydrocarbon, but the ratio of the heat of combustion (891 kJ/mol) to the molecular mass (16.0 g/mol, of which 12.0 g/mol is carbon) shows that methane, being the simplest hydrocarbon, produces more heat per mass unit (55.7 kJ/g) than other complex hydrocarbons. In many areas with a dense enough population, methane is piped into homes and businesses for heating, cooking, and industrial uses. In this context it is usually known as natural gas, which is considered to have an energy content of 39 megajoules per cubic meter, or 1,000 BTU per standard cubic foot. Liquefied natural gas (LNG) is predominantly methane converted into liquid form for ease of storage or transport.

==== Rocket propellant ====
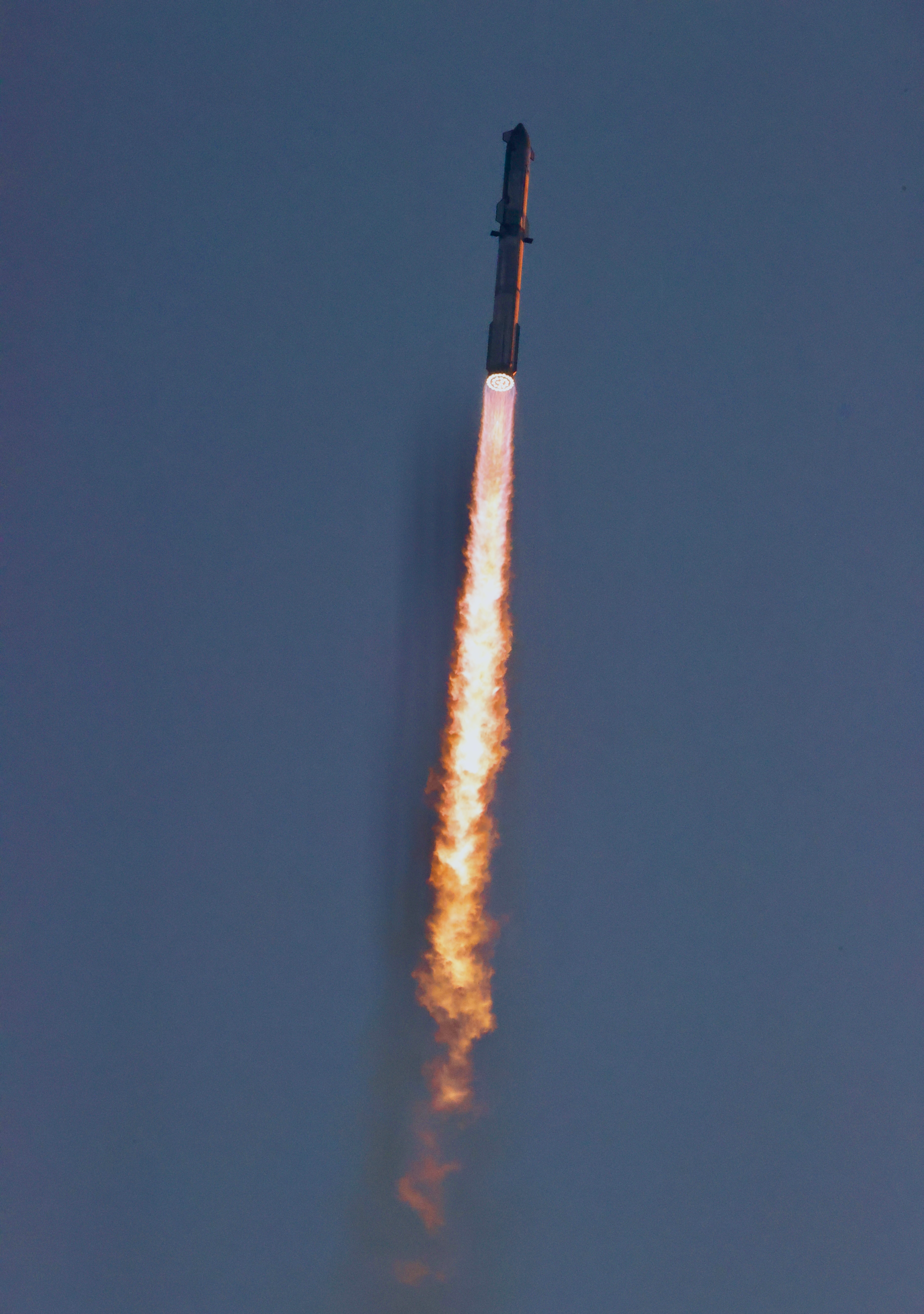
New-generation, reusable launch vehicles such as SpaceX Starship prefer using liquid methane (in combination with liquid oxygen, collectively known as methalox) as their primary propellant.

Refined liquid methane as well as LNG is used as a rocket fuel, when combined with liquid oxygen, as in the TQ-12, BE-4, Raptor, YF-215, and Aeon engines. Due to the similarities between methane and LNG such engines are commonly grouped together under the term methalox.

As a liquid rocket propellant, a methane/liquid oxygen combination offers the advantage over kerosene/liquid oxygen combination, or kerolox, of producing small exhaust molecules, reducing coking or deposition of soot on engine components. Methane is easier to store than hydrogen due to its higher boiling point and density, as well as its lack of hydrogen embrittlement. The lower molecular weight of the exhaust also increases the fraction of the heat energy which is in the form of kinetic energy available for propulsion, increasing the specific impulse of the rocket. Compared to liquid hydrogen, the specific energy of methane is lower but this disadvantage is offset by methane's greater density and temperature range, allowing for smaller and lighter tankage for a given fuel mass. Liquid methane has a temperature range (91–112 K) nearly compatible with liquid oxygen (54–90 K). The fuel currently sees use in operational launch vehicles such as Zhuque-2, Vulcan and New Glenn as well as in-development launchers such as Starship, Neutron, Terran R, Nova, and Long March 9.

=== Chemical feedstock ===
Natural gas, which is mostly composed of methane, is used to produce hydrogen gas on an industrial scale. Steam methane reforming (SMR), or simply known as steam reforming, is the standard industrial method of producing commercial bulk hydrogen gas. More than 50 million metric tons are produced annually worldwide (2013), principally from the SMR of natural gas. Much of this hydrogen is used in petroleum refineries, in the production of chemicals and in food processing. Very large quantities of hydrogen are used in the industrial synthesis of ammonia.

At high temperatures (700–1100 °C) and in the presence of a metal-based catalyst (nickel), steam reacts with methane to yield a mixture of CO and H_{2}, known as "water gas" or "syngas":

CH_{4} + H_{2}O ⇌ CO + 3 H_{2}

This reaction is strongly endothermic (consumes heat, Δ_{r}H = 206 kJ/mol). Additional hydrogen is obtained by the reaction of CO with water via the water-gas shift reaction:

CO + H_{2}O ⇌ CO_{2} + H_{2}

This reaction is mildly exothermic (produces heat, Δ_{r}H = −41 kJ/mol).

Methane is also subjected to free-radical chlorination in the production of chloromethanes, although methanol is a more typical precursor.

Hydrogen can also be produced via the direct decomposition of methane, also known as methane pyrolysis, which, unlike steam reforming, produces no greenhouse gases (GHG). The heat needed for the reaction can also be GHG emission free, e.g. from concentrated sunlight, renewable electricity, or burning some of the produced hydrogen. If the methane is from biogas then the process can be a carbon sink. Temperatures in excess of 1200 °C are required to break the bonds of methane to produce hydrogen gas and solid carbon. Through the use of a suitable catalyst the reaction temperature can be reduced to between 550 and 900 °C depending on the chosen catalyst. Dozens of catalysts have been tested, including unsupported and supported metal catalysts, carbonaceous and metal-carbon catalysts.

The reaction is moderately endothermic as shown in the reaction equation below.

CH_{4}(g) → C(s) + 2 H_{2}(g)
(ΔH° = 74.8 kJ/mol)

=== Refrigerant ===
As a refrigerant, methane has the ASHRAE designation R-50.

== Generation ==
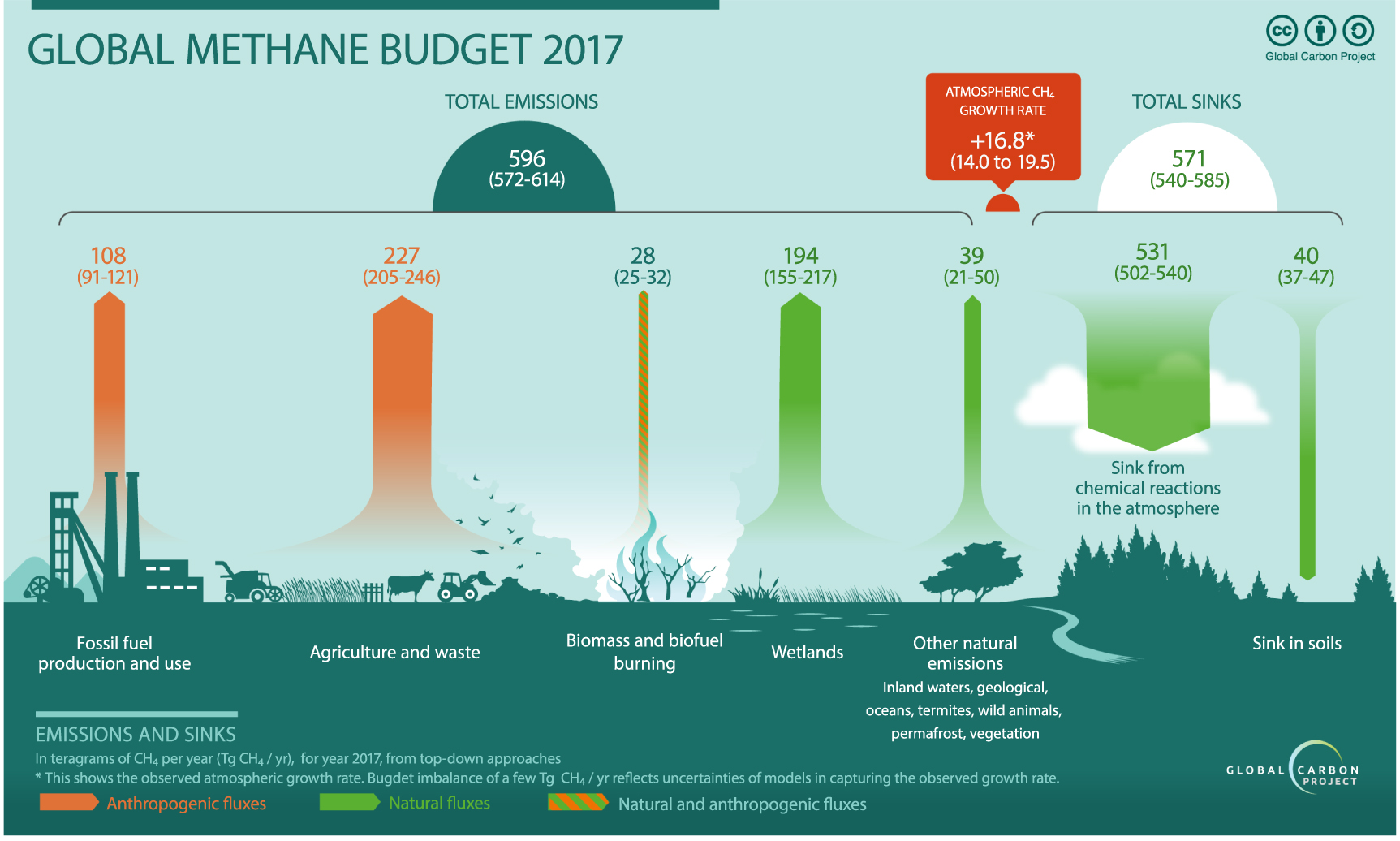
Global methane budget (2017). Shows natural sources and sinks (green), anthropogenic sources (orange), and mixed natural and anthropogenic sources (hatched orange-green for 'biomass and biofuel burning').

Methane can be generated through geological, biological or industrial routes.

=== Geological routes ===
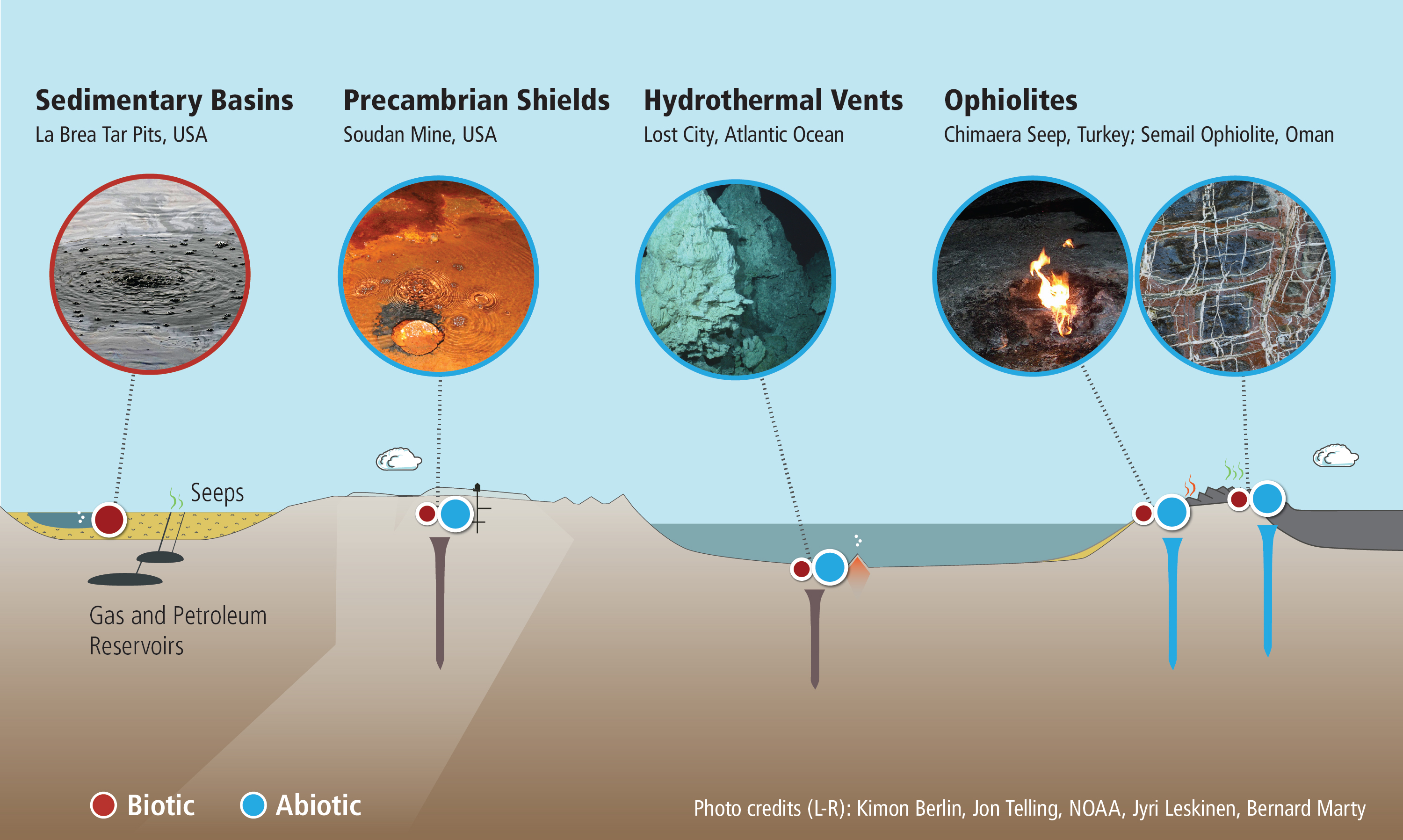
Abiotic sources of methane have been found in more than 20 countries and in several deep ocean regions so far.

The two main routes for geological methane generation are (i) organic (thermally generated, or thermogenic) and (ii) inorganic (abiotic). Thermogenic methane occurs due to the breakup of organic matter at elevated temperatures and pressures in deep sedimentary strata. Most methane in sedimentary basins is thermogenic; therefore, thermogenic methane is the most important source of natural gas. Thermogenic methane components are typically considered to be relic (from an earlier time). Generally, formation of thermogenic methane (at depth) can occur through organic matter breakup, or organic synthesis. Both ways can involve microorganisms (methanogenesis), but may also occur inorganically. The processes involved can also consume methane, with and without microorganisms.

The more important source of methane at depth (crystalline bedrock) is abiotic. Abiotic means that methane is created from inorganic compounds, without biological activity, either through magmatic processes or via water-rock reactions that occur at low temperatures and pressures, like serpentinization.

=== Biological routes ===
Most of Earth's methane is biogenic and is produced by methanogenesis, a form of anaerobic respiration only known to be conducted by some members of the domain Archaea. Methanogens occur in landfills and soils, ruminants (for example, cattle), the guts of termites, and the anoxic sediments below the seafloor and the bottom of lakes.

This multistep process is used by these microorganisms for energy. The net reaction of methanogenesis is:

CO_{2} + 4 H_{2} → CH_{4} + 2 H_{2}O

The final step in the process is catalyzed by the enzyme methyl coenzyme M reductase (MCR).

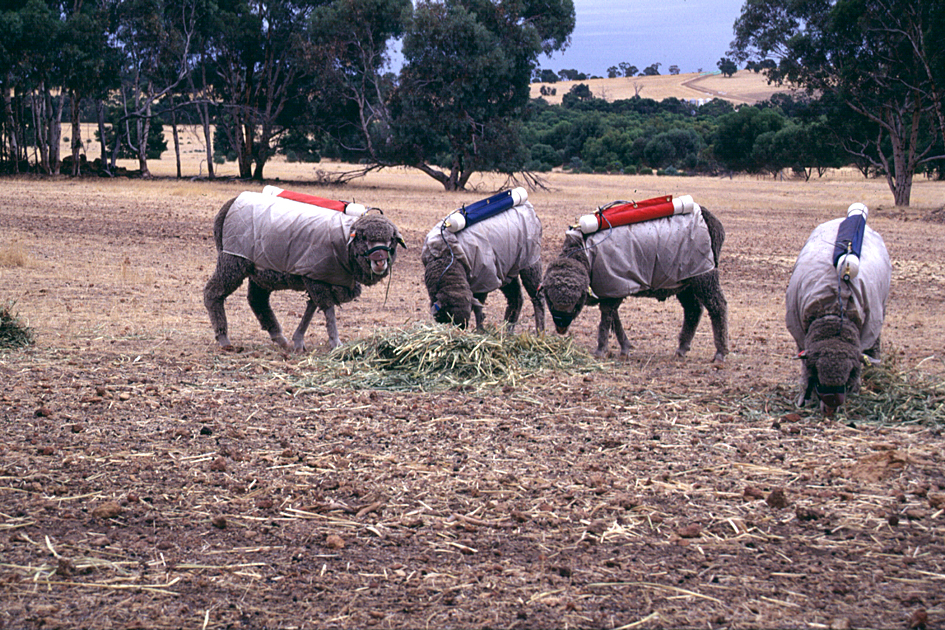
Testing Australian sheep for exhaled methane production (2001), CSIRO

This image represents a ruminant, specifically a sheep, producing methane in the four stages of hydrolysis, acidogenesis, acetogenesis, and methanogenesis.

==== Wetlands ====
Wetlands are the largest natural sources of methane to the atmosphere, accounting for approximately 20–30% of atmospheric methane. Climate change is increasing the amount of methane released from wetlands due to increased temperatures and altered rainfall patterns. This phenomenon is called wetland methane feedback.

Rice cultivation generates as much as 12% of total global methane emissions due to the long-term flooding of rice fields.

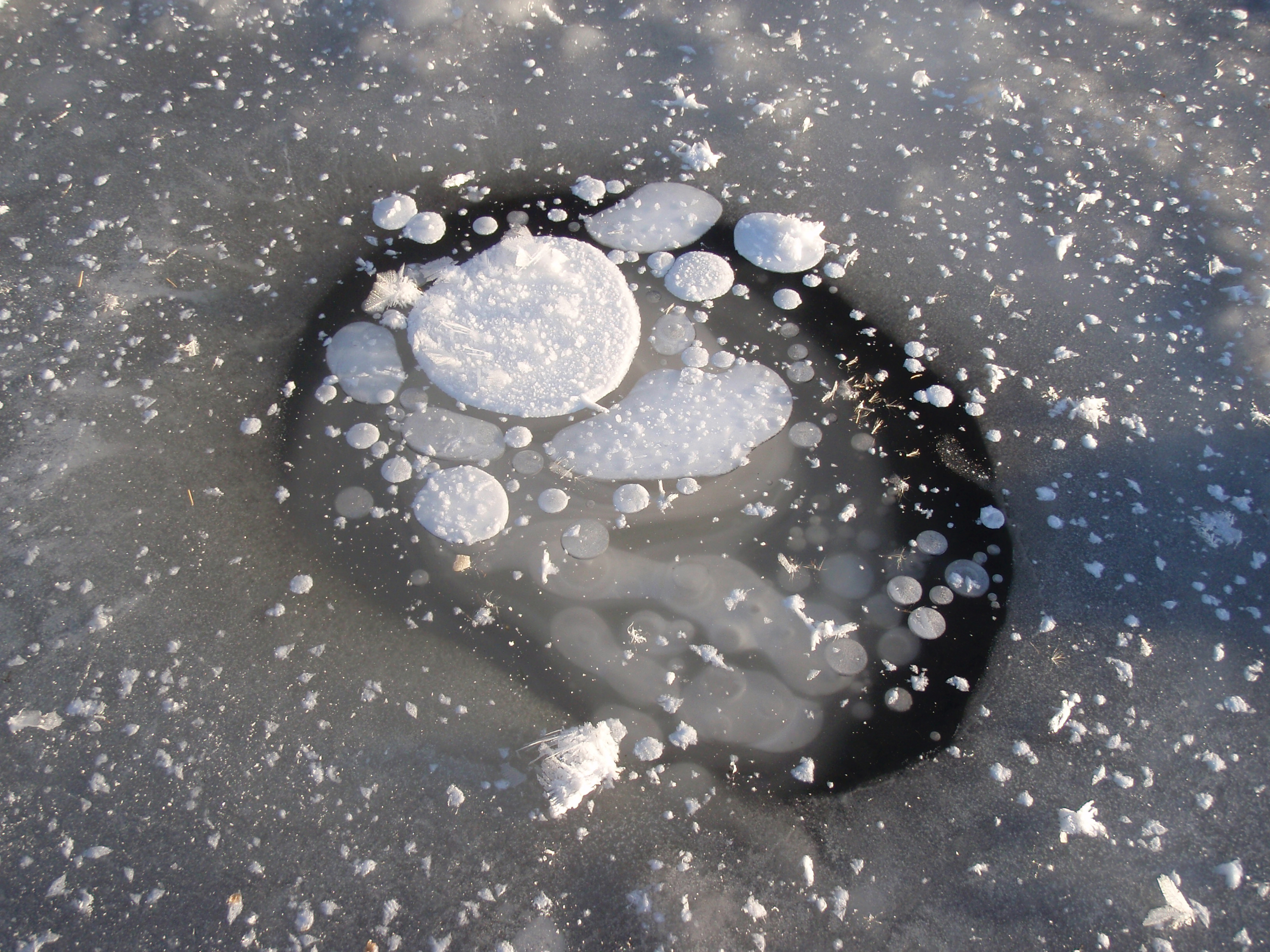
Frozen methane bubbles on a lake

==== Ruminants ====
Ruminants such as cattle belch out methane, accounting for about 22% of the U.S. annual methane emissions to the atmosphere. Other sources of methane emissions on farm are feed production, manure management and transportOne study reported that the livestock sector in general (primarily cattle, chickens, and pigs) produces 37% of all human-induced methane. A 2013 study estimated that livestock accounted for 44% of human-induced methane and about 15% of human-induced greenhouse gas emissions. Many efforts are underway to reduce livestock methane production, such as medical treatments, dietary adjustments, breeding strategies and to trap the gas to use its combustion energy.

==== Seafloor sediments ====
Most of the subseafloor is anoxic because oxygen is removed by aerobic microorganisms within the first few centimeters of the sediment. Below the oxygen-replete seafloor, methanogens produce methane that is either used by other organisms or becomes trapped in gas hydrates. These other organisms that utilize methane for energy are known as methanotrophs ('methane-eating'), and are the main reason why little methane generated at depth reaches the sea surface. Consortia of Archaea and Bacteria have been found to oxidize methane via anaerobic oxidation of methane (AOM); the organisms responsible for this are anaerobic methanotrophic Archaea (ANME) and sulfate-reducing bacteria (SRB).

=== Industrial routes ===
This diagram shows a method for producing methane sustainably. See: electrolysis, Sabatier reaction

Given its cheap abundance in natural gas, there is little incentive to produce methane industrially. Methane can be produced by hydrogenating carbon dioxide through the Sabatier process. Methane is also a side product of the hydrogenation of carbon monoxide in the Fischer–Tropsch process, which is practiced on a large scale to produce longer-chain molecules than methane.

An example of large-scale coal-to-methane gasification is the Great Plains Synfuels plant, started in 1984 in Beulah, North Dakota as a way to develop abundant local resources of low-grade lignite, a resource that is otherwise difficult to transport for its weight, ash content, low calorific value and propensity to spontaneous combustion during storage and transport. A number of similar plants exist around the world, although mostly these plants are targeted towards the production of long chain alkanes for use as gasoline, diesel, or feedstock to other processes.

Power to methane is a technology that uses electrical power to produce hydrogen from water by electrolysis and uses the Sabatier reaction to combine hydrogen with carbon dioxide to produce methane.

==== Laboratory synthesis ====
Methane can be produced by protonation of methyl lithium or a methyl Grignard reagent such as methylmagnesium chloride. It can also be made from anhydrous sodium acetate and dry sodium hydroxide, mixed and heated above 300 °C (with sodium carbonate as byproduct). In practice, a requirement for pure methane can easily be fulfilled by steel gas bottle from standard gas suppliers.

== Occurrence ==
Methane is the major component of natural gas, about 87% by volume. The major source of methane is extraction from geological deposits known as natural gas fields, with coal seam gas extraction becoming a major source (see coal bed methane extraction, a method for extracting methane from a coal deposit, while enhanced coal bed methane recovery is a method of recovering methane from non-mineable coal seams). It is associated with other hydrocarbon fuels, and sometimes accompanied by helium and nitrogen. Methane is produced at shallow levels (low pressure) by anaerobic decay of organic matter and reworked methane from deep under the Earth's surface. In general, the sediments that generate natural gas are buried deeper and at higher temperatures than those that contain oil.

Methane is generally transported in bulk by pipeline in its natural gas form, or by LNG carriers in its liquefied form; few countries transport it by truck.

== Atmospheric methane and climate change ==
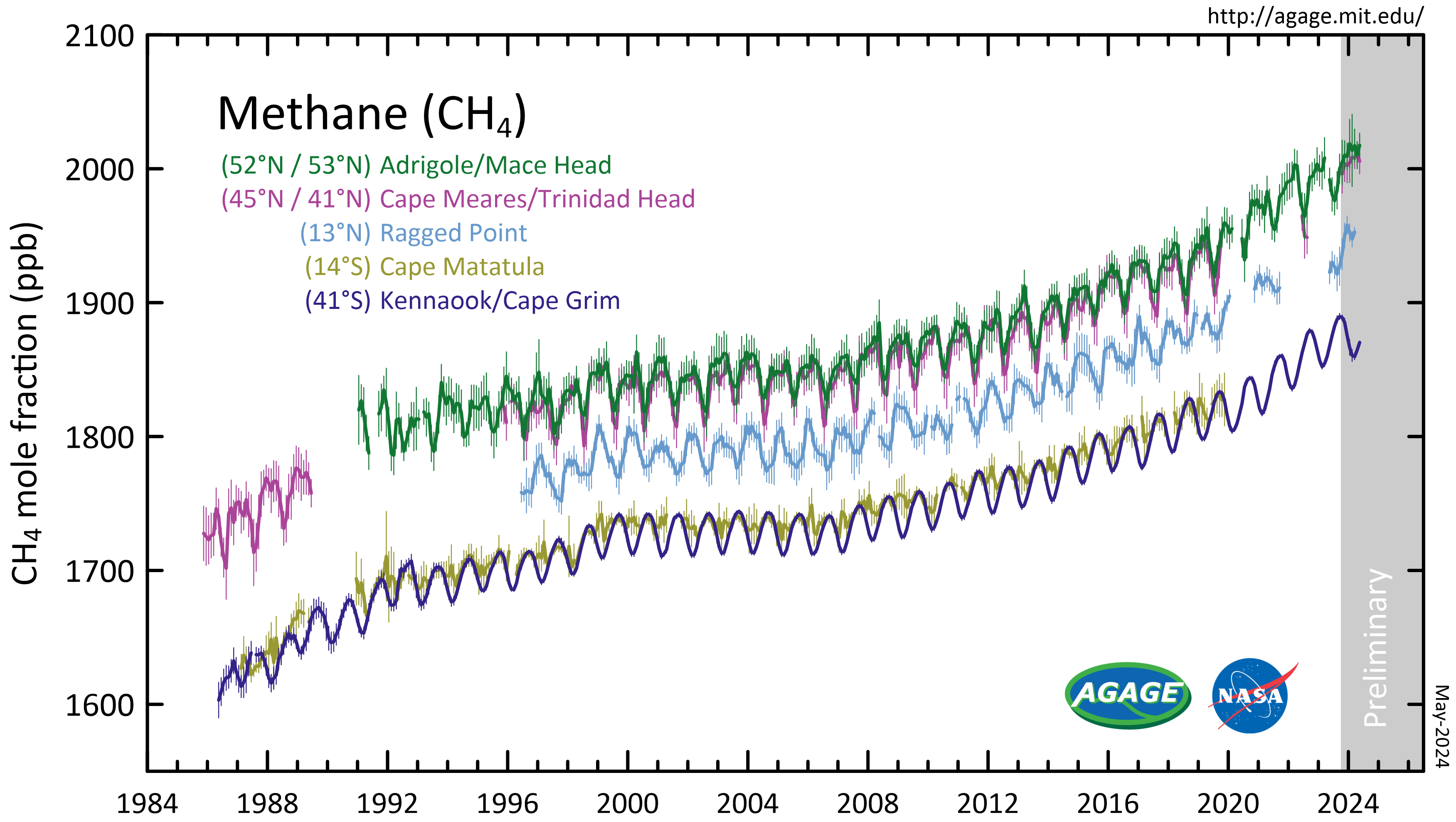
Methane (CH_{4}) measured by the Advanced Global Atmospheric Gases Experiment (AGAGE) in the lower atmosphere (troposphere) at stations around the world. Abundances are given as pollution free monthly mean mole fractions in parts-per-billion.

Methane is an important greenhouse gas, responsible for around 30% of the rise in global temperatures since the industrial revolution.

Methane has a global warming potential (GWP) of 29.8 ± 11 compared to CO_{2} (potential of 1) over a 100-year period, and 82.5 ± 25.8 over a 20-year period. This means that, for example, a leak of one tonne of methane is equivalent to emitting 82.5 tonnes of carbon dioxide. Burning methane and producing carbon dioxide also reduces the greenhouse gas impact compared to simply venting methane to the atmosphere.

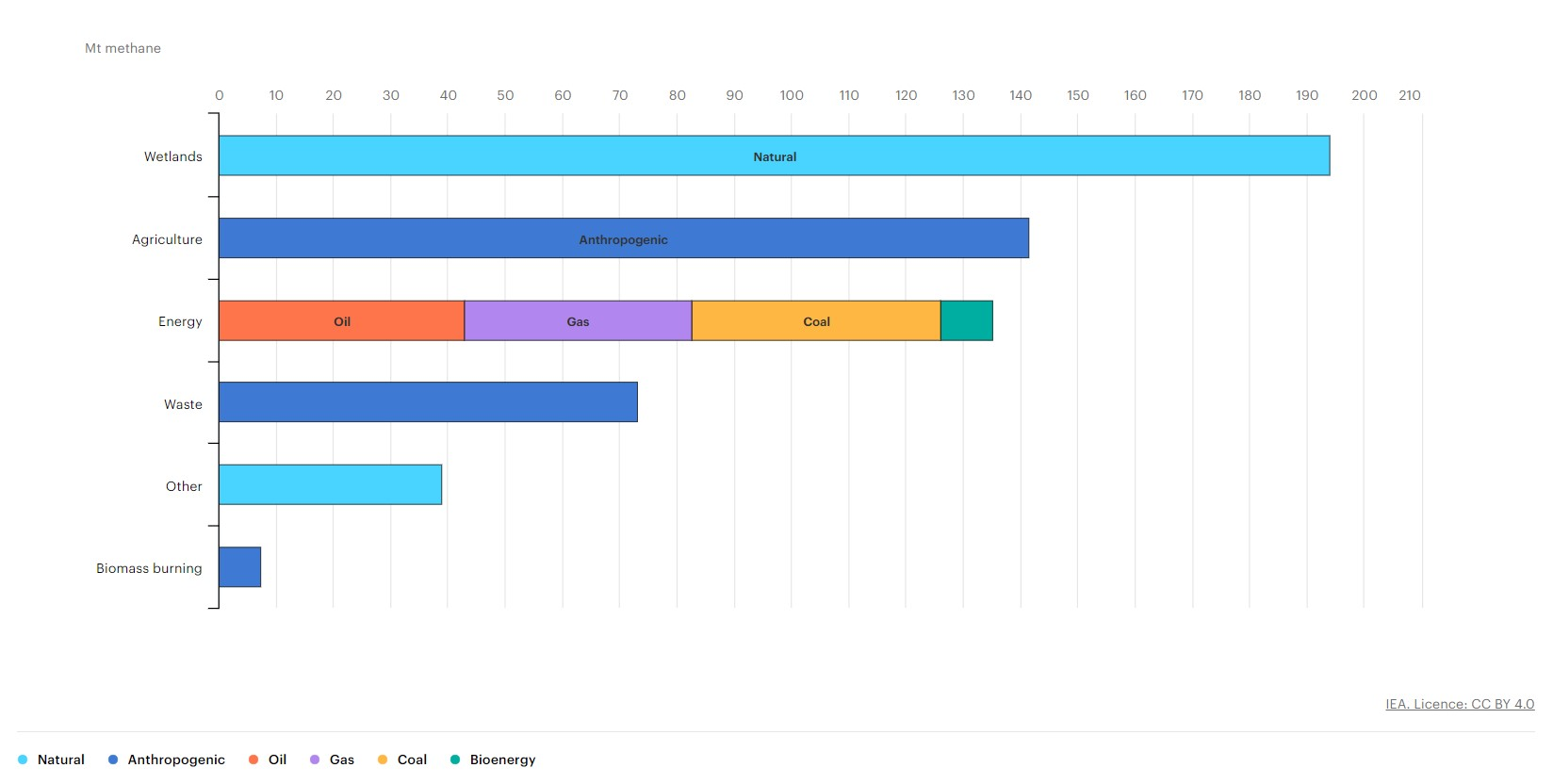
Sources of global methane emissions

As methane is gradually converted into carbon dioxide (and water) in the atmosphere, these values include the climate forcing from the carbon dioxide produced from methane over these timescales.

Annual global methane emissions are currently approximately 580 Mt, 40% of which is from natural sources and the remaining 60% originating from human activity, known as anthropogenic emissions. The largest anthropogenic source is agriculture, responsible for around one quarter of emissions, closely followed by the energy sector, which includes emissions from coal, oil, natural gas and biofuels.

Historic methane concentrations in the world's atmosphere have ranged between 300 and 400 nmol/mol during glacial periods commonly known as ice ages, and between 600 and 700 nmol/mol during the warm interglacial periods. A 2012 NASA website said the oceans were a potential important source of Arctic methane, but more recent studies associate increasing methane levels as caused by human activity.

Global monitoring of atmospheric methane concentrations began in the 1980s. The Earth's atmospheric methane concentration has increased 160% since preindustrial levels in the mid-18th century. In 2013, atmospheric methane accounted for 20% of the total radiative forcing from all of the long-lived and globally mixed greenhouse gases. Between 2011 and 2019 the annual average increase of methane in the atmosphere was 1866 ppb. From 2015 to 2019 sharp rises in levels of atmospheric methane were recorded.

In 2019, the atmospheric methane concentration was higher than at any time in the last 800,000 years. As stated in the AR6 of the IPCC, "Since 1750, increases in CO_{2} (47%) and CH_{4} (156%) concentrations far exceed, and increases in N_{2}O (23%) are similar to, the natural multi-millennial changes between glacial and interglacial periods over at least the past 800,000 years (very high confidence)". (Note: In 2013 Intergovernmental Panel on Climate Change (IPCC) scientists warned atmospheric concentrations of methane had "exceeded the pre-industrial levels by about 150% which represented "levels unprecedented in at least the last 800,000 years.")

In February 2020, it was reported that fugitive emissions and gas venting from the fossil fuel industry may have been significantly underestimated. The largest annual increase occurred in 2021 with the overwhelming percentage caused by human activity.

Climate change can increase atmospheric methane levels by increasing methane production in natural ecosystems, forming a climate change feedback. Another explanation for the rise in methane emissions could be a slowdown of the chemical reaction that removes methane from the atmosphere.

Over 100 countries have signed the Global Methane Pledge, launched in 2021, promising to cut their methane emissions by 30% by 2030. This could avoid 0.2 °C of warming globally by 2050, although there have been calls for higher commitments in order to reach this target. The International Energy Agency's 2022 report states "the most cost-effective opportunities for methane abatement are in the energy sector, especially in oil and gas operations".

According to the IEA's 2026 Global Methane Tracker, there is "no sign that global energy-related methane emissions declined in 2025", with these remaining "at very high levels". Record fossil fuel production was responsible for 35% of human-caused methane emissions, estimated at 124 Mt, a slight increase from 121 Mt in 2024.

=== Clathrates ===
Methane clathrates (also known as methane hydrates) are solid cages of water molecules that trap single molecules of methane. Significant reservoirs of methane clathrates have been found in arctic permafrost and along continental margins beneath the ocean floor within the gas clathrate stability zone, located at high pressures (1 to 100 MPa; lower end requires lower temperature) and low temperatures (< 15 °C; upper end requires higher pressure). Methane clathrates can form from biogenic methane, thermogenic methane, or a mix of the two. These deposits are both a potential source of methane fuel as well as a potential contributor to global warming. The global mass of carbon stored in gas clathrates is still uncertain and has been estimated as high as 12,500 Gt carbon and as low as 500 Gt carbon. The estimate has declined over time with a most recent estimate of ≈1800 Gt carbon. A large part of this uncertainty is due to our knowledge gap in sources and sinks of methane and the distribution of methane clathrates at the global scale. For example, a source of methane was discovered relatively recently in an ultraslow spreading ridge in the Arctic. Some climate models suggest that today's methane emission regime from the ocean floor is potentially similar to that during the period of the Paleocene–Eocene Thermal Maximum (PETM) around 55.5 million years ago, although there are no data indicating that methane from clathrate dissociation currently reaches the atmosphere. Arctic methane release from permafrost and seafloor methane clathrates is a potential consequence and further cause of global warming; this is known as the clathrate gun hypothesis. Data from 2016 indicate that Arctic permafrost thaws faster than predicted.

== Public safety and the environment ==
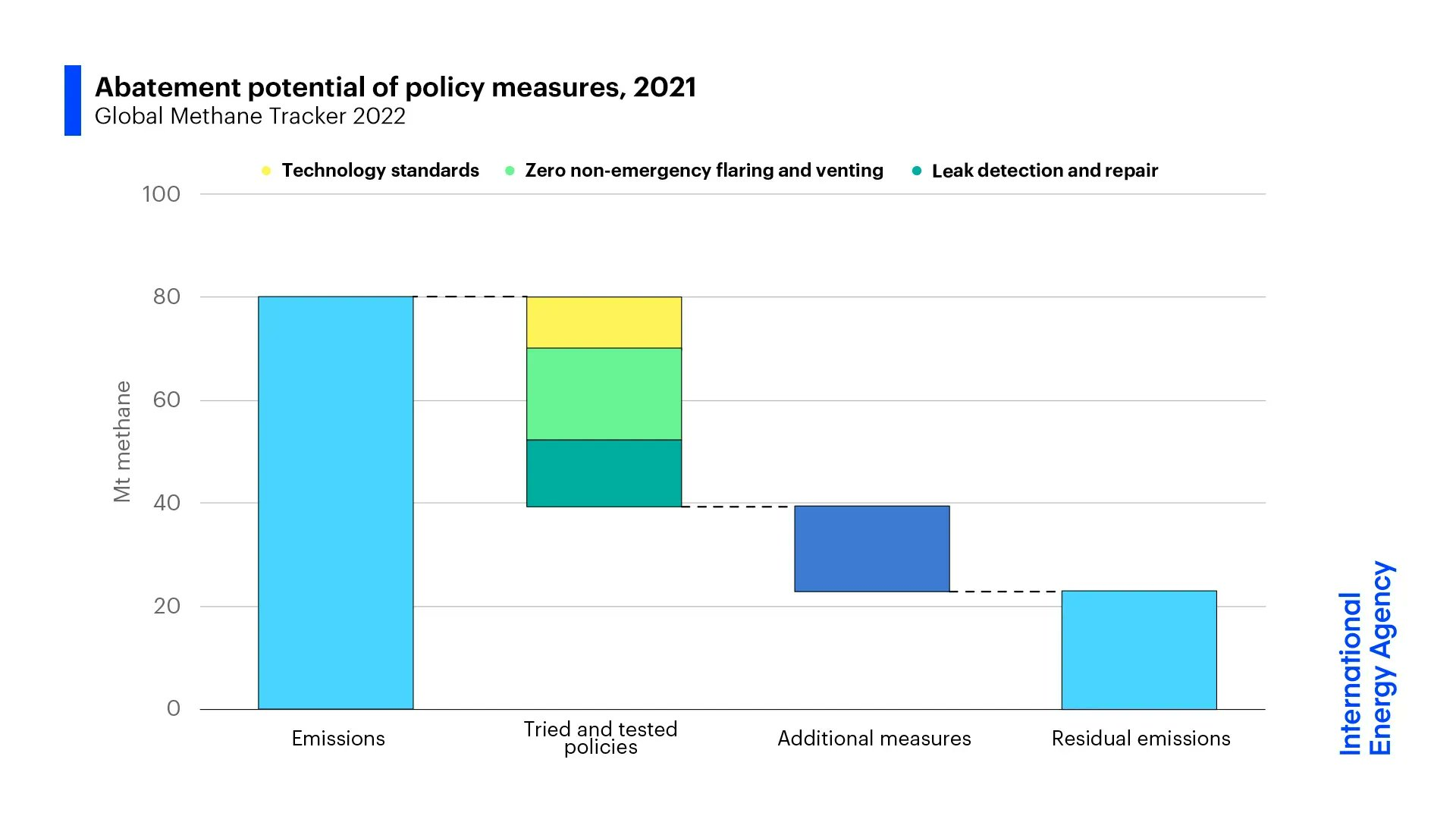
An International Energy Agency graphic showing the potential of various emission reduction policies for addressing global methane emissions.

Methane "degrades air quality and adversely impacts human health, agricultural yields, and ecosystem productivity".

The 2015–2016 methane gas leak in Aliso Canyon, California was considered to be the worst in terms of its environmental effect in American history. It was also described as more damaging to the environment than Deepwater Horizon's leak in the Gulf of Mexico.

In May 2023 The Guardian published a report blaming Turkmenistan as the worst in the world for methane super emitting. The data collected by Kayrros researchers indicate that two large Turkmen fossil fuel fields leaked 2.6 million and 1.8 million metric tonnes of methane in 2022 alone, pumping the CO_{2} equivalent of 366 million tonnes into the atmosphere, surpassing the annual CO_{2} emissions of the United Kingdom.

== Extraterrestrial methane ==
Methane is abundant in many parts of the Solar System and potentially could be harvested on the surface of another Solar System body (in particular, using methane production from local materials found on Mars or Titan), providing fuel for a return journey.

Methane has been detected on all planets of the Solar System and most of the larger moons. With the possible exception of Mars, it is believed to have come from abiotic processes.

=== Interstellar medium ===
Infrared astronomy has detected methane in molecular clouds of the interstellar medium.

=== Mars ===
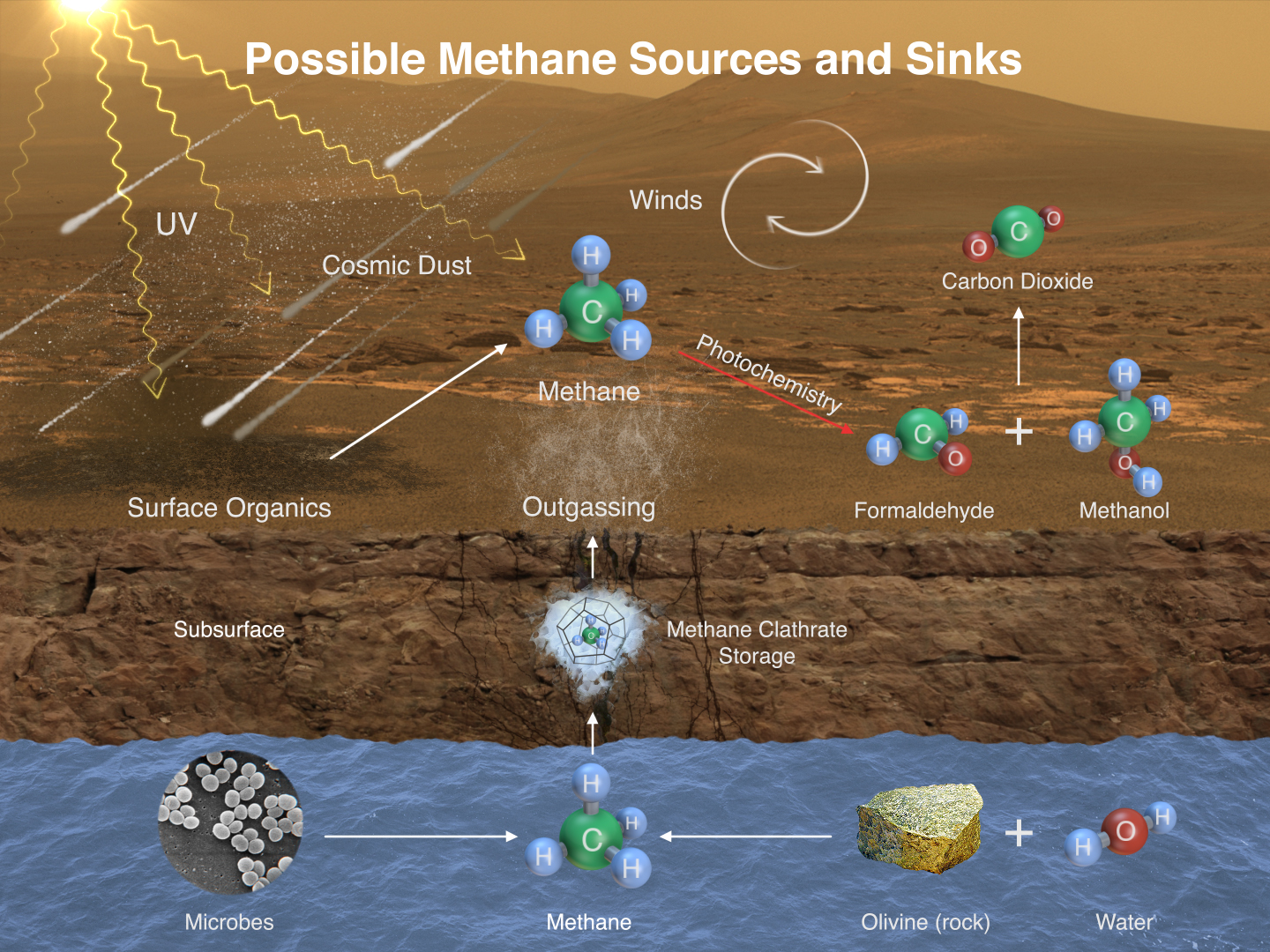
Methane (CH_{4}) on Mars – potential sources and sinks

The Curiosity rover has documented seasonal fluctuations of atmospheric methane levels on Mars. These fluctuations peaked at the end of the Martian summer at 0.6 parts per billion. Methane could be produced by a non-biological process called serpentinization (Note: There are many serpentinization reactions. Olivine is a solid solution between forsterite and fayalite whose general formula is (Fe,Mg)_{2}SiO_{4}. The reaction producing methane from olivine can be written as: Forsterite + Fayalite + Water + Carbonic acid → Serpentine + Magnetite + Methane , or (in balanced form): 18 Mg_{2}SiO_{4} + 6 Fe_{2}SiO_{4} + 26 H_{2}O + CO_{2} → 12 Mg_{3}Si_{2}O_{5}(OH)_{4} + 4 Fe_{3}O_{4} + CH_{4}) involving water, carbon dioxide, and the mineral olivine, which is known to be common on Mars. There has been some speculation that methanogenic microbes, such as bacteria in the sub-surface, could also be responsible for methane on Mars; however there is no other evidence that such lifeforms exist.

Methane has been proposed as a possible rocket propellant on future Mars missions due in part to the possibility of synthesizing it on the planet by in situ resource utilization. An adaptation of the Sabatier methanation reaction may be used with a mixed catalyst bed and a reverse water-gas shift in a single reactor to produce methane and oxygen from the raw materials available on Mars, utilizing water from the Martian subsoil and carbon dioxide in the Martian atmosphere.

=== Titan ===
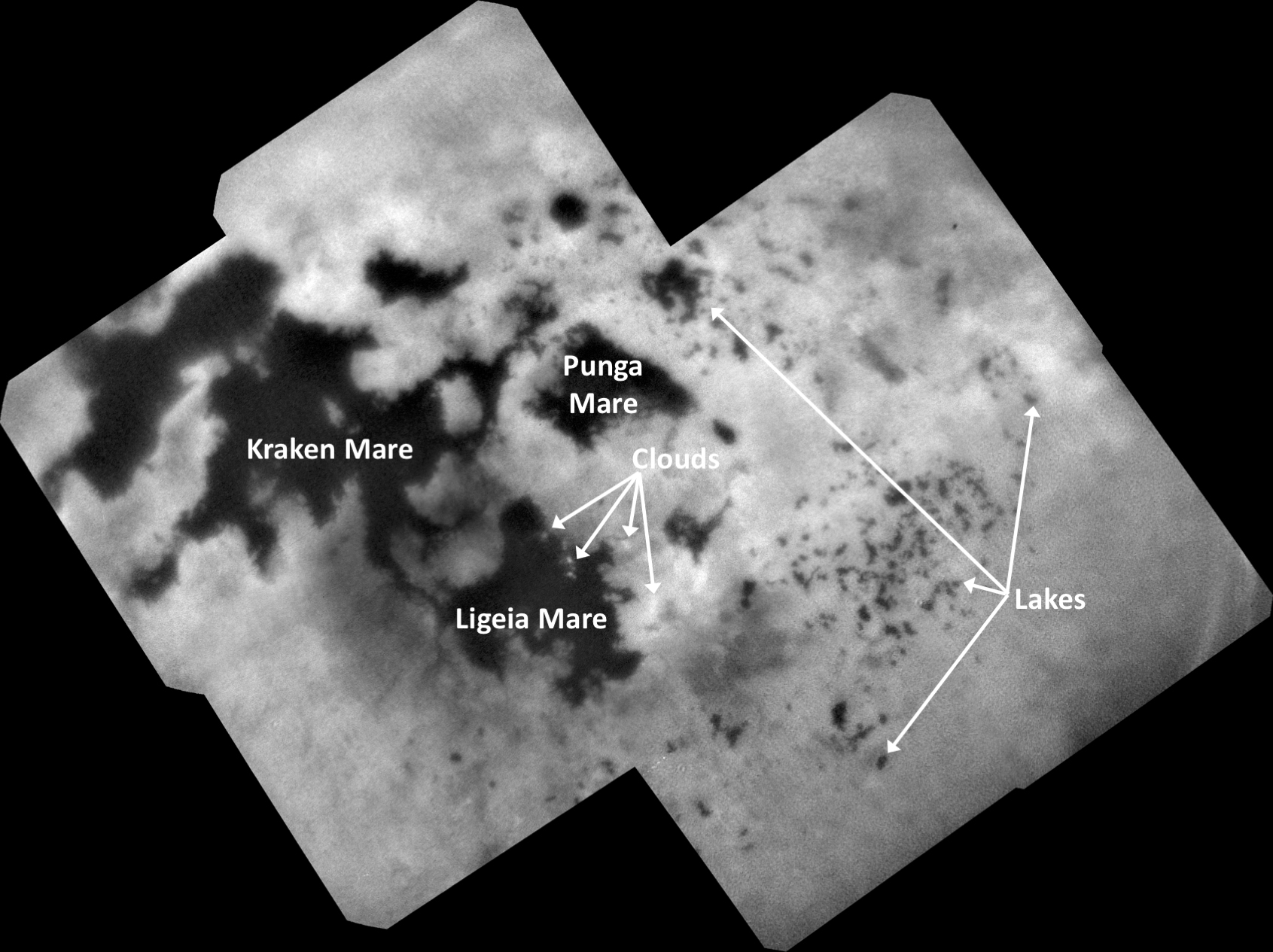
Titan lakes (September 11, 2017)

Methane has been detected in vast abundance on Titan, the largest moon of Saturn. It comprises a significant portion of its atmosphere and also exists in a liquid form on its surface, where it comprises the majority of the liquid in Titan's vast lakes of hydrocarbons, the second largest of which is believed to be almost pure methane in composition.

The presence of stable lakes of liquid methane on Titan, as well as the surface of Titan being highly chemically active and rich in organic compounds, has led scientists to consider the possibility of life existing within Titan's lakes, using methane as a solvent in the place of water for Earth-based life and using hydrogen in the atmosphere to derive energy with acetylene.

== History ==
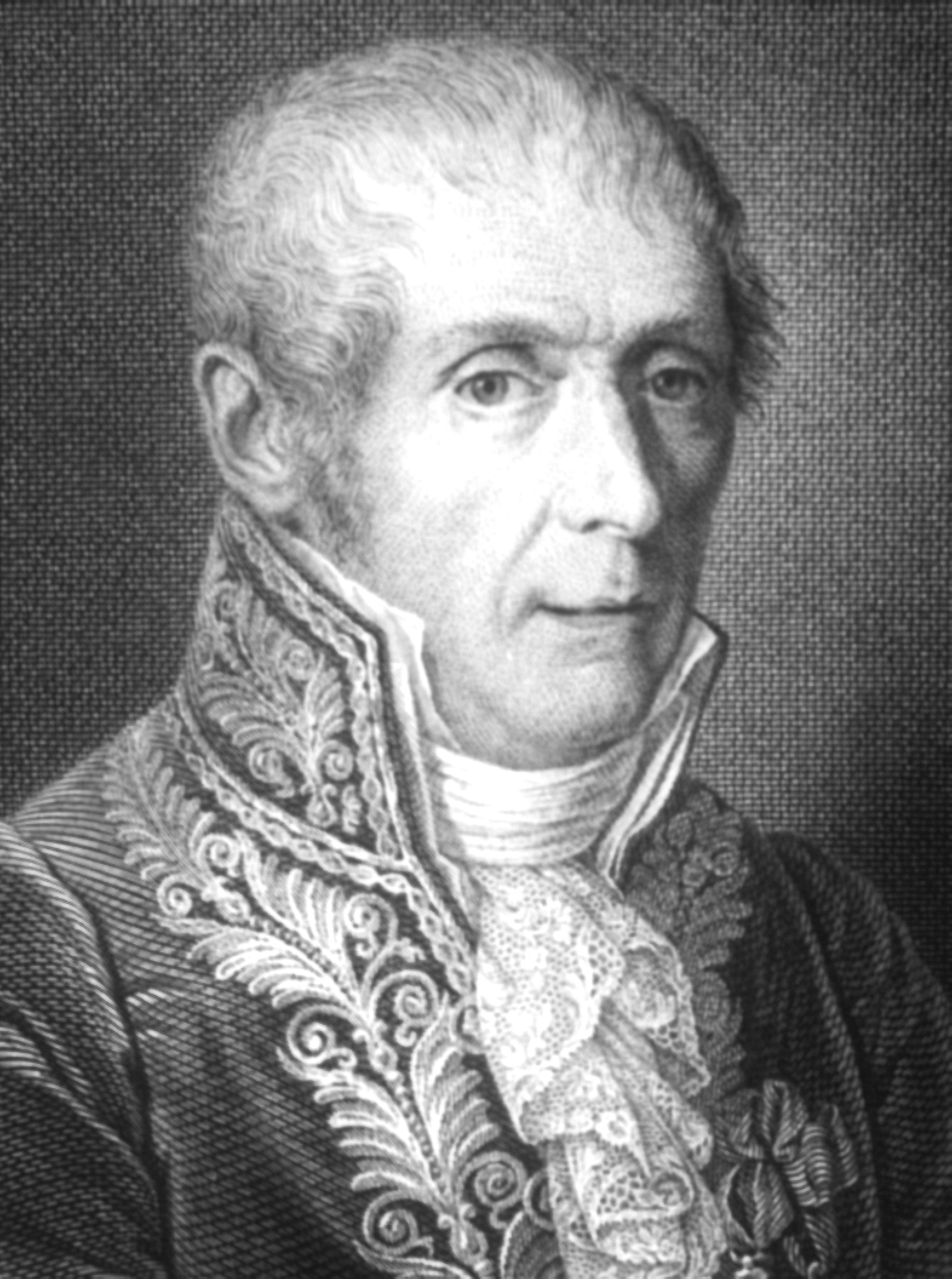
Alessandro Volta

The discovery of methane is credited to Italian physicist Alessandro Volta, who characterized numerous properties including its flammability limit and origin from decaying organic matter.

Volta was initially motivated by reports of "inflammable air" present in marshes by his friend Father Carlo Giuseppe Campi. While on a fishing trip to Lake Maggiore straddling Italy and Switzerland in November 1776, he noticed the presence of bubbles in the nearby marshes and decided to investigate. Volta collected the gas rising from the marsh and showed that the gas would catch fire if exposed to a flame or spark.

Volta notes similar observations of "inflammable air" were present previously in scientific literature, including a letter written by Benjamin Franklin.

Following the Felling mine disaster of 1812 in which 92 men perished, Sir Humphry Davy established that the feared firedamp was in fact largely methane.

The name "methane" was coined in 1866 by the German chemist August Wilhelm von Hofmann. The name was derived from methanol.

== Etymology ==
Etymologically, the word methane is coined from the chemical suffix "-ane", which denotes substances belonging to the alkane family; and the word methyl, which is derived from the German Methyl (1840) or directly from the French méthyle, which is a back-formation from the French méthylène (corresponding to English "methylene"), the root of which was coined by Jean-Baptiste Dumas and Eugène-Melchior Péligot in 1834 from the Greek μέθυ méthy (wine) (related to English "mead") and ὕλη hýlē (meaning "wood"). The radical is named after this because it was first detected in methanol, an alcohol first isolated by distillation of wood. The chemical suffix -ane is from the coordinating chemical suffix -ine which is from Latin feminine suffix -ina which is applied to represent abstracts. The coordination of "-ane", "-ene", "-one", etc. was proposed in 1866 by German chemist August Wilhelm von Hofmann.

=== Abbreviations ===
The abbreviation CH_{4}-C can mean the mass of carbon contained in a mass of methane, and the mass of methane is always 1.33 times the mass of CH_{4}-C. CH_{4}-C can also mean the methane-carbon ratio, which is 1.33 by mass. Methane at scales of the atmosphere is commonly measured in teragrams (Tg CH_{4}) or millions of metric tons (MMT CH_{4}), which mean the same thing. Other standard units are also used, such as nanomole (nmol, one billionth of a mole), mole (mol), kilogram, and gram.

== Safety ==
Methane is an asphyxiant gas, meaning that it is non-toxic and the primary health hazard is displacement of oxygen in high enough concentrations, potentially causing death by asphyxiation. No systemic toxicity has been detected at 5% concentration in air.

Methane is an extremely flammable gas at normal ambient temperature. It may form explosive mixtures with air. Methane gas explosions are responsible for many deadly mining disasters. A methane gas explosion was the cause of the Upper Big Branch coal mine disaster in West Virginia on April 5, 2010, killing 29. Natural gas accidental release has also been a major focus in the field of safety engineering, due to past accidental releases that concluded in the formation of jet fire disasters.

== See also ==
- 2007 Zasyadko mine disaster
- Abiogenic petroleum origin
- Aerobic methane production
- Anaerobic digestion
- Anaerobic respiration
- Arctic methane emissions
- Atmospheric methane
- Biogas
- Coal Oil Point seep field
- Energy density
- Fugitive gas emissions
- Global Methane Initiative
- Thomas Gold
- Halomethane, halogenated methane derivatives.
- Hydrogen cycle
- Industrial gas
- Lake Kivu (more general: limnic eruption)
- List of straight-chain alkanes
- Methanation
- Methane emissions
- Methane on Mars:
  - atmosphere
  - climate
- Methanogen, archaea that produce methane.
- Methanogenesis, microbes that produce methane.
- Methanotroph, bacteria that grow with methane.
- Methyl group, a functional group related to methane.

== Cited sources ==
- Haynes, William M., ed. (2016). CRC Handbook of Chemistry and Physics (97th ed.). CRC Press. ISBN 978-1-4987-5429-3.
