= Aerenchyma =

Spongy tissue in plants

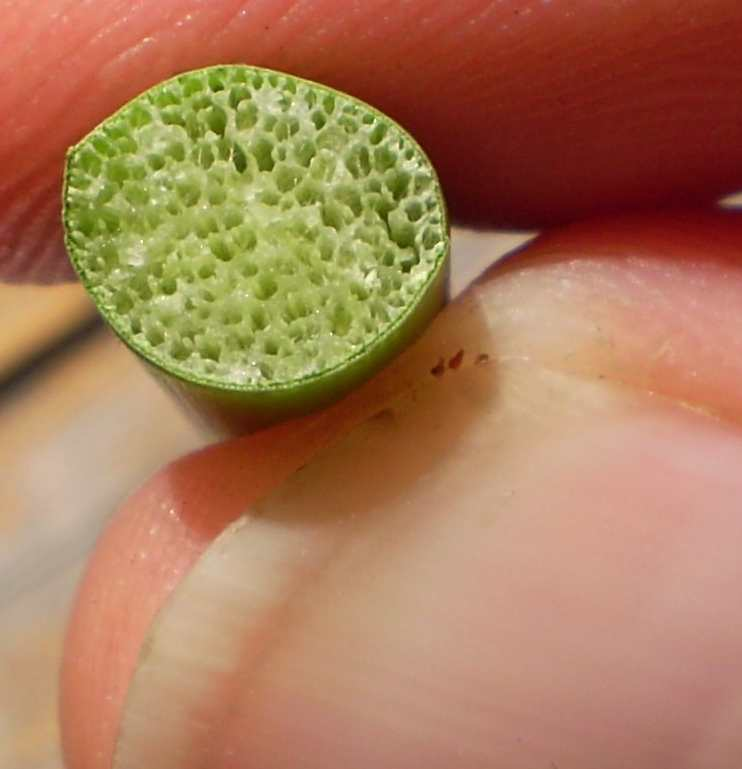
Aerenchyma in stem cross section of a typical wetland plant

Aerenchyma or aeriferous parenchyma or lacunae is a modification of the parenchyma to form a spongy tissue that creates spaces or air channels in the leaves, stems, and roots of some plants, which allows the exchange of gases between the shoot and the root. The channels of air-filled cavities (see image to right) provide a low-resistance internal pathway for the exchange of gases such as oxygen, carbon dioxide, and ethylene between the plant above the water and the submerged tissues. Aerenchyma is also widespread in aquatic and wetland plants which must grow in hypoxic soils.

The word "aerenchyma" is Modern Latin derived from Latin aer for "air" and Greek enkhyma for "infusion."

== Aerenchyma formation and hypoxia ==
Aerenchyma (air-filled cavities) occur in two forms. Lysigenous aerenchyma form via apoptosis of particular cortical root cells to form air-filled cavities. Schizogenous aerenchyma form via decomposition of pectic substances in the middle lamellae with consequent cell separation.

When soil is flooded, hypoxia develops, as soil microorganisms consume oxygen faster than diffusion occurs. The presence of hypoxic soils is one of the defining characteristics of wetlands. Many wetland plants possess aerenchyma, and in some, such as water-lilies, there is mass flow of atmospheric air through leaves and rhizomes. There are many other chemical consequences of hypoxia. For example, nitrification is inhibited as low oxygen occurs and toxic compounds are formed, as anaerobic bacteria use nitrate, manganese, and sulfate as alternative electron acceptors. The reduction-oxidation potential of the soil decreases and metal oxides such as iron and manganese dissolve, however, radial oxygen loss allows re-oxidation of these ions in the rhizosphere.

In general, low oxygen stimulates plants to produce ethylene.

== Advantages ==
The large air-filled cavities provide a low-resistance internal pathway for the exchange of gases between the plant organs above the water and the submerged tissues. This allows plants to grow without incurring the metabolic costs of anaerobic respiration. Moreover, the degradation of cortical cells during aerenchyma formation reduce the metabolic costs of plants during stresses such as drought. Some of the oxygen transported through the aerenchyma leaks through root pores into the surrounding soil. The resulting small rhizosphere of oxygenated soil around individual roots supports microorganisms that prevent the influx of potentially toxic soil components such as sulfide, iron, and manganese.
