= List of Eragrostis species =

As of January 2018, the World Checklist of Selected Plant Families accepted the following species of Eragrostis.

== A ==
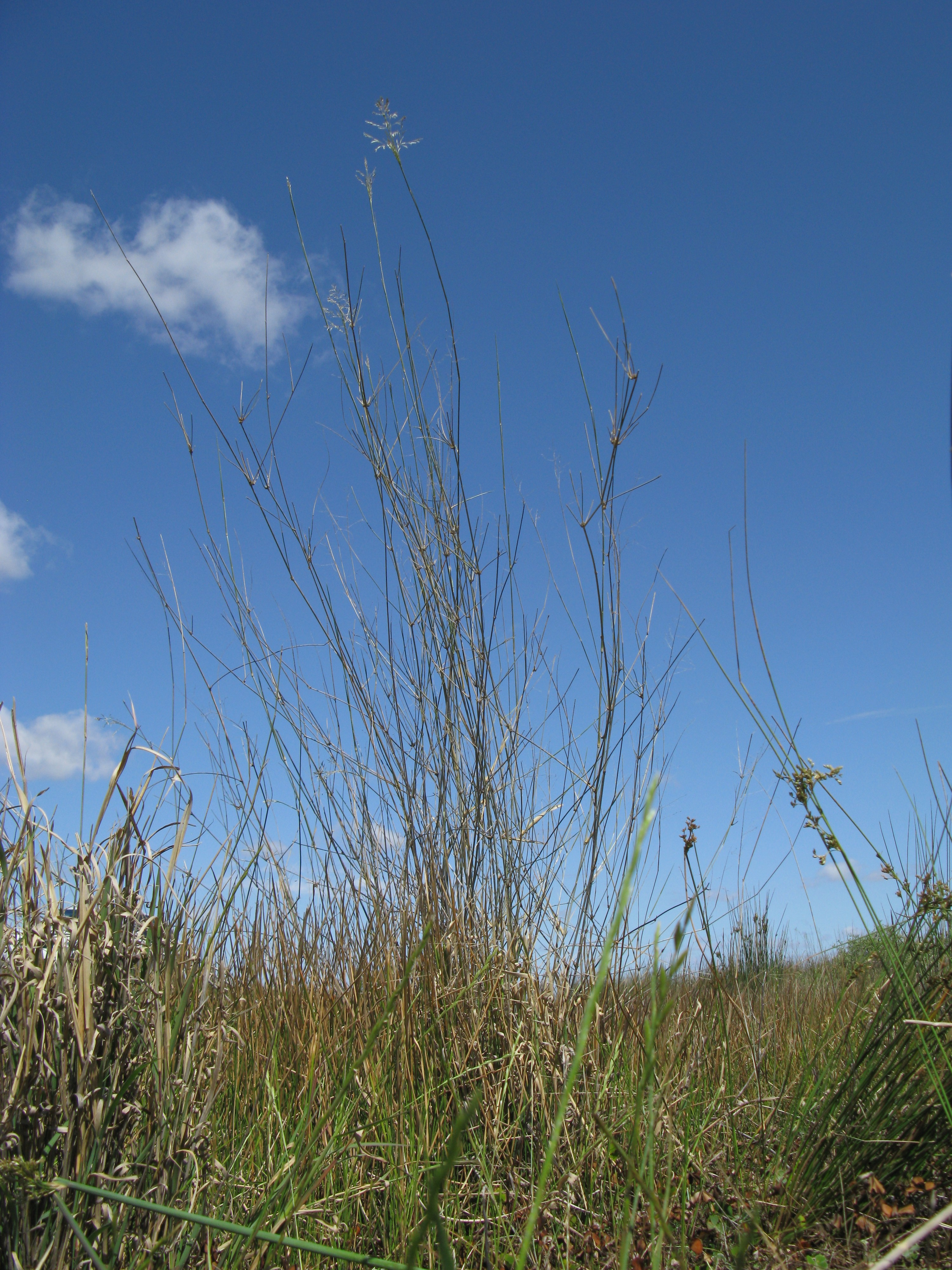
Eragrostis australasica

- Eragrostis acamptoclada Cope – S. Tropical Africa
- Eragrostis acraea De Winter – S. Tropical & S. Africa
- Eragrostis acutiflora (Kunth) Nees – Tropical America
- Eragrostis acutiglumis Parodi – S. Brazil to N.E. Argentina
- Eragrostis aegyptiaca (Willd.) Delile – N. & W. Tropical Africa to Sudan
- Eragrostis aethiopica Chiov. – Ethiopia to S. Africa, Madagascar, Arabian Peninsula
- Eragrostis airoides Nees – Colombia to Venezuela, Bolivia to Brazil and N. Argentina
- Eragrostis alopecuroides Balansa – Indo-China
- Eragrostis alta Keng – Hainan
- Eragrostis alveiformis Lazarides – E. Australia
- Eragrostis amabilis (L.) Wight & Arn. – Tropical & Subtrop. Old World
- Eragrostis amanda Clayton – Kenya
- Eragrostis ambleia Clayton – Somalia to Kenya
- Eragrostis ambohibengensis A.Camus – Madagascar
- Eragrostis ambositrensis A.Camus – Madagascar
- Eragrostis ambrensis A.Camus – Madagascar
- Eragrostis amurensis Prob. – S.E. Belarus to Russian Far East and Mongolia
- Eragrostis anacrantha Cope – Zambia
- Eragrostis anacranthoides Cope – Zambia
- Eragrostis andicola R.E.Fr. – Peru, N.W. Argentina
- Eragrostis annulata Rendle ex Scott Elliot – Angola to S. Africa
- Eragrostis apiculata Döll – Brazil (Minas Gerais)
- Eragrostis aquatica Honda – Japan (W. Honshu)
- Eragrostis arenicola C.E.Hubb. – Tropical & S. Africa
- Eragrostis aristata De Winter – Namibia
- Eragrostis aristiglumis Kabuye – S.W. Tanzania
- Eragrostis articulata (Schrank) Nees – Bolivia to Brazil and N. Argentina
- Eragrostis aspera (Jacq.) Nees – Africa, Arabian Peninsula, S. India, Indo-China
- Eragrostis astrepta S.M.Phillips – Ethiopia
- Eragrostis astreptoclada Cope – Tanzania to Zambia
- Eragrostis atropioides Hildebr. – Hawaiian Islands
- Eragrostis atrovirens (Desf.) Trin. ex Steud. – Tropical & Subtrop. Old World
- Eragrostis attenuata Hitchc. – S.W. Peru to N. Chile
- Eragrostis aurorae Launert – S. Tropical Africa
- Eragrostis australasica (Steud.) C.E.Hubb. – Australia
- Eragrostis autumnalis Keng – Central & S. China

== B ==
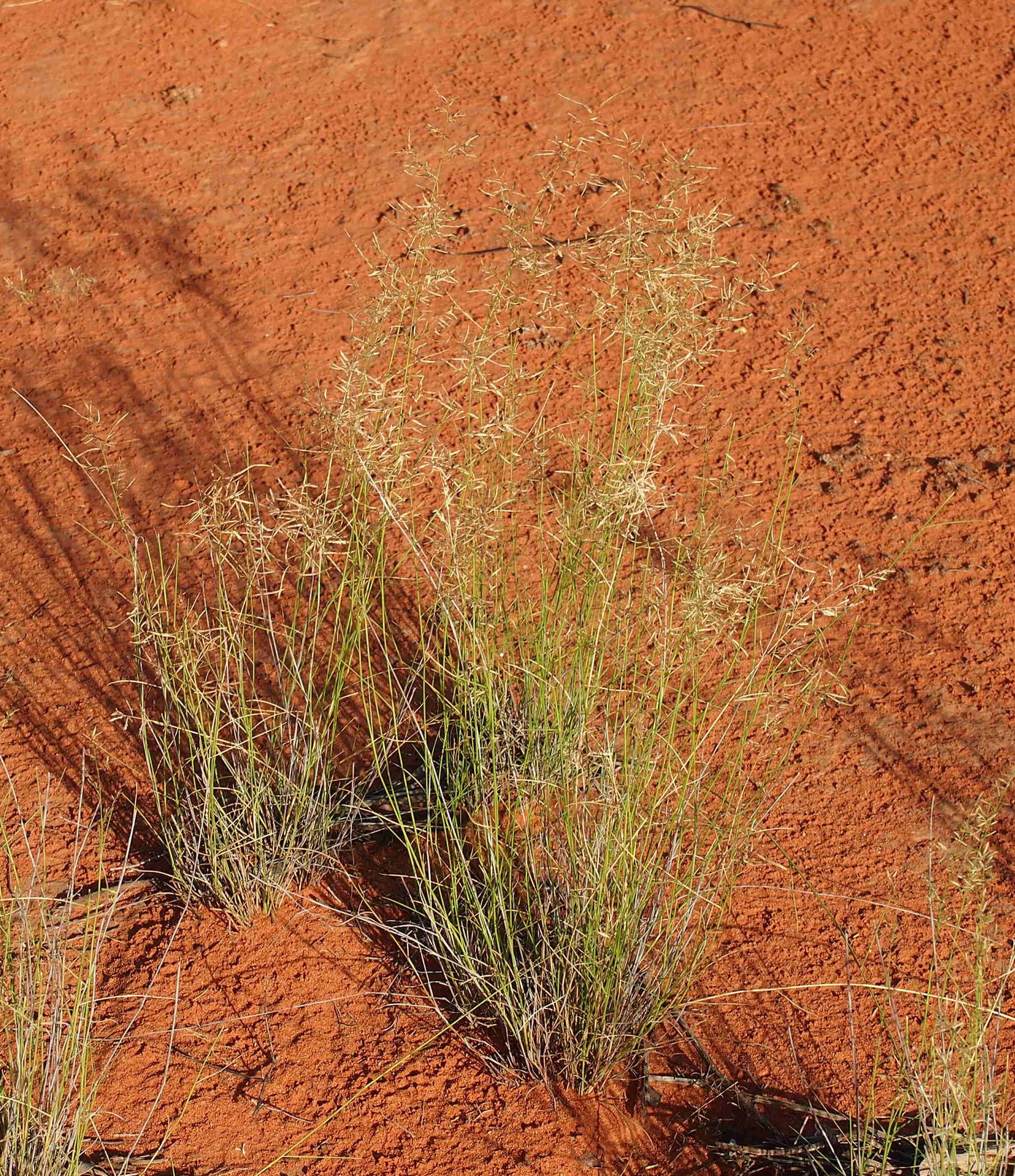
Eragrostis barrelieri

- Eragrostis bahamensis Hitchc. – Bahamas to Turks-Caicos Islands
- Eragrostis bahiensis Schult. – Mexico to S. Tropical America
- Eragrostis balgooyi Veldkamp – New Guinea (Kep. Aru)
- Eragrostis barbinodis Hack. – Mozambique to S. Africa
- Eragrostis barbulata Stapf – Myanmar
- Eragrostis barrelieri Daveau – Macaronesia to Arabian Peninsula, Mediterranean to Pakistan
- Eragrostis barteri C.E.Hubb. – W. Tropical Africa to Chad
- Eragrostis basedowii Jedwabn. – Australia
- Eragrostis bemarivensis A.Camus – Madagascar
- Eragrostis bergiana (Kunth) Trin. – S. Africa
- Eragrostis berteroniana (Schult.) Steud. – Cuba to Hispaniola
- Eragrostis betsileensis A.Camus – Madagascar
- Eragrostis bicolor Nees – S. Tropical & S. Africa
- Eragrostis biflora Hack. – Ethiopia, S. Tropical & S. Africa
- Eragrostis blepharostachya K.Schum. – W. Tropical Africa
- Eragrostis boinensis A.Camus – Madagascar
- Eragrostis boivinii Steud. – Madagascar
- Eragrostis boriana Launert – Iraq
- Eragrostis botryodes Clayton – Ethiopia to S. Tropical Africa
- Eragrostis brainii (Stent) Launert – S. Tropical Africa
- Eragrostis braunii Schweinf. – N.E. & E. Tropical Africa to Arabian Peninsula
- Eragrostis brizantha Nees – S. Africa
- Eragrostis brownii (Kunth) Nees – Tropical & Subtrop. Asia to Easter I
- Eragrostis burmanica Bor – S. India, W. Indo-China

== C ==
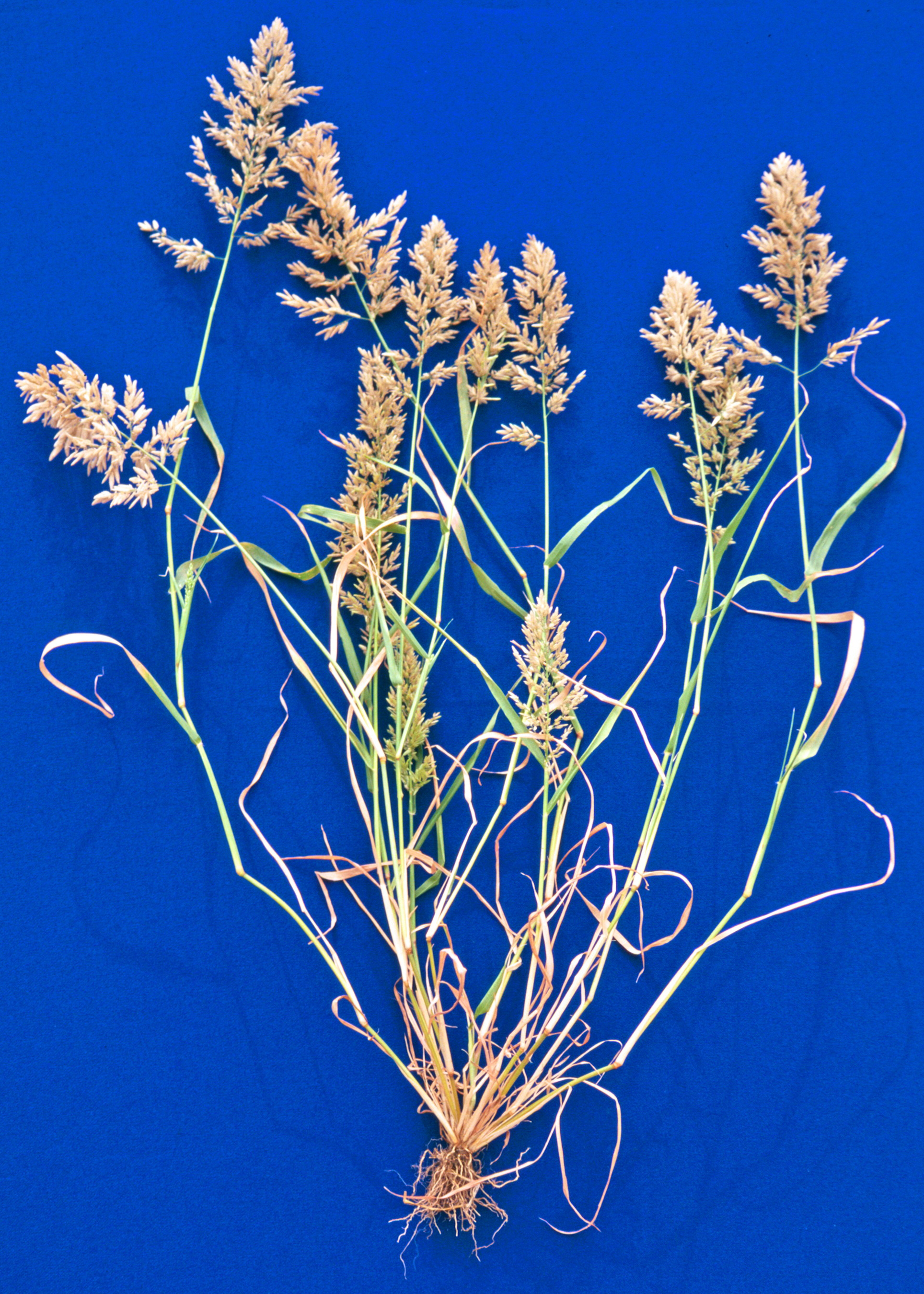
Eragrostis cilianensis

- Eragrostis caesia Stapf – Zimbabwe to S .Africa
- Eragrostis caespitosa Chiov. – Somalia to Mozambique
- Eragrostis camerunensis Clayton – Nigeria to Cameroon
- Eragrostis canescens C.E.Hubb. – Tanzania to Malawi
- Eragrostis caniflora Rendle – Tanzania to S. Tropical Africa
- Eragrostis capensis (Thunb.) Trin. – Congo to Ethiopia and S. Africa, Madagascar
- Eragrostis capillaris (L.) Nees – E. Canada to Central Mexico
- Eragrostis capitula Lazarides – Queensland
- Eragrostis capitulifera Chiov. – Ethiopia to N. Kenya
- Eragrostis capuronii A.Camus – Madagascar
- Eragrostis cassa Lazarides – Queensland
- Eragrostis castellaneana Buscal. & Muschl. – Tanzania to S. Tropical Africa
- Eragrostis cataclasta Nicora – Brazil to N.E. Argentina
- Eragrostis cenolepis Clayton – W. Tropical Africa to Cameroon
- Eragrostis chabouisii Bosser – Madagascar
- Eragrostis chalarothyrsos C.E.Hubb. – W. Tropical Africa to Ethiopia and Tanzania
- Eragrostis chapelieri (Kunth) Nees – Tropical & S. Africa, Madagascar
- Eragrostis chiquitaniensis Killeen – Bolivia to Paraguay
- Eragrostis cilianensis (All.) Janch. – Old World
- Eragrostis ciliaris (L.) R.Br. – Tropical & Subtrop. Old World
- Eragrostis ciliata (Roxb.) Nees – India, Sri Lanka, Indo-China, Hainan, Jawa
- Eragrostis cimicina Launert – S. Tropical & S. Africa
- Eragrostis coarctata Stapf – Indian Subcontinent to Indo-China
- Eragrostis collina Trin. – E. Europe to N.W. China and Iran
- Eragrostis collinensis Vivek, G.V.S.Murthy & V.J.Nair – S.W. India
- Eragrostis comptonii De Winter – Swaziland
- Eragrostis concinna (R.Br.) Steud. – N. Australia
- Eragrostis condensata (J.Presl) Steud. – Ecuador
- Eragrostis conertii Lobin – Cape Verde
- Eragrostis confertiflora J.M.Black – Australia
- Eragrostis congesta Oliv. – Congo to Kenya and KwaZulu-Natal
- Eragrostis contrerasii R.W.Pohl – S. Mexico to Guatemala
- Eragrostis crassinervis Hack. – Zimbabwe to S. Africa
- Eragrostis crateriformis Lazarides – N.W. & Central Australia
- Eragrostis cubensis Hitchc. – Cuba, Jamaica
- Eragrostis cumingii Steud. – Tropical & Subtrop. Asia to N. Australia
- Eragrostis curtipedicellata Buckley – Central & S.E. U.S.A. to N.E. Mexico
- Eragrostis curvula (Schrad.) Nees – Cameroon to Eritrea and S. Africa
- Eragrostis cylindrica (Roxb.) Arn. – Nepal, S.E. China to Vietnam, Taiwan
- Eragrostis cylindriflora Hochst. – Africa

== D ==
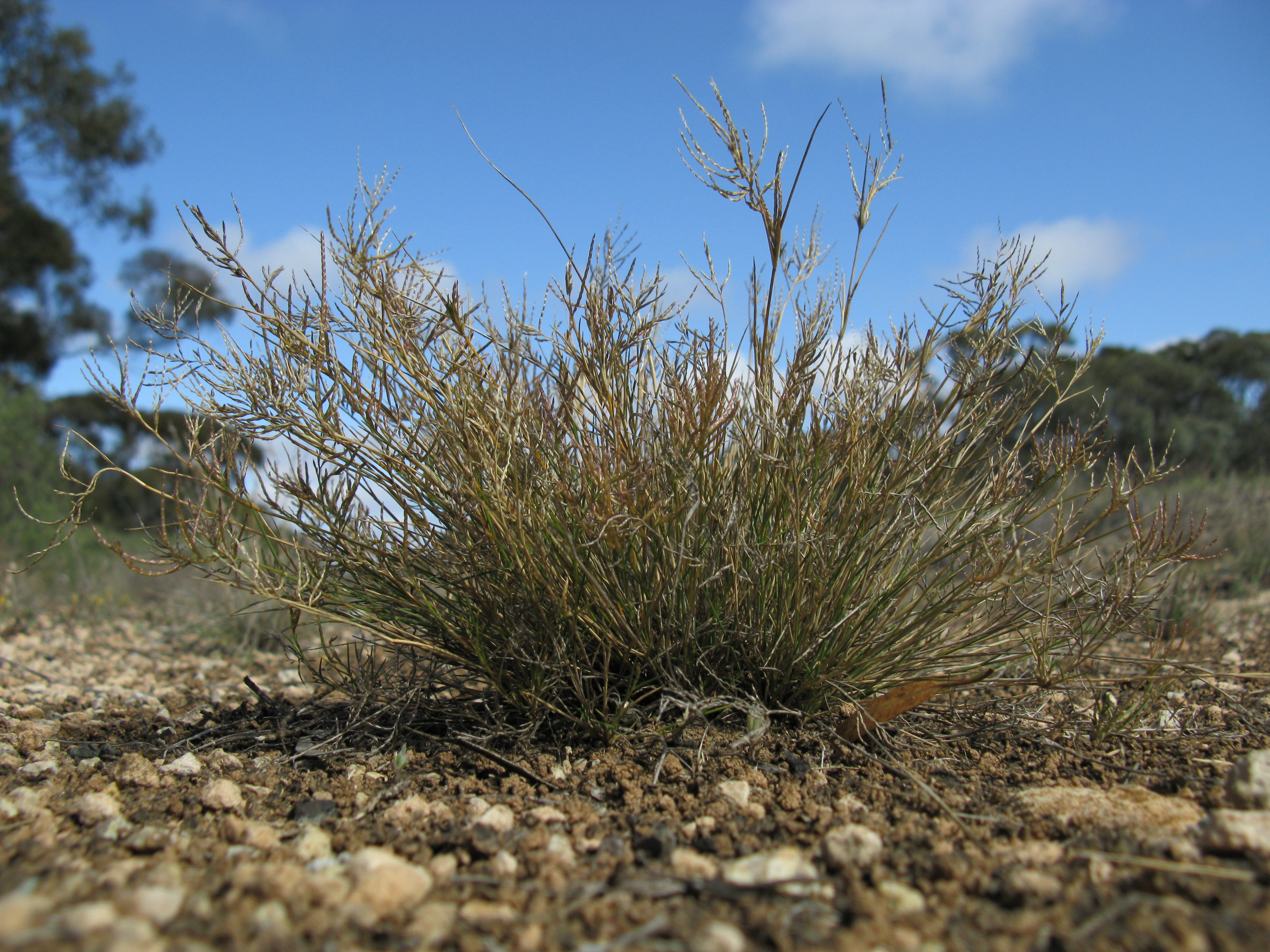
Eragrostis dielsii

- Eragrostis deccanensis Bor – S. India
- Eragrostis decumbens Renvoize – Aldabra
- Eragrostis deflexa Hitchc. – Hawaiian Islands
- Eragrostis dentifera Launert – Zambia
- Eragrostis desertorum Domin – Australia
- Eragrostis desolata Launert – E. Zimbabwe to Northern Province
- Eragrostis dielsii Pilg. – Australia
- Eragrostis dinteri Stapf – Angola to Botswana
- Eragrostis divaricata Cope – S. DR Congo to Zambia
- Eragrostis duricaulis B.S.Sun & S.Wang – China (Yunnan)
- Eragrostis dyskritos Lasut – Sulawesi

== E ==
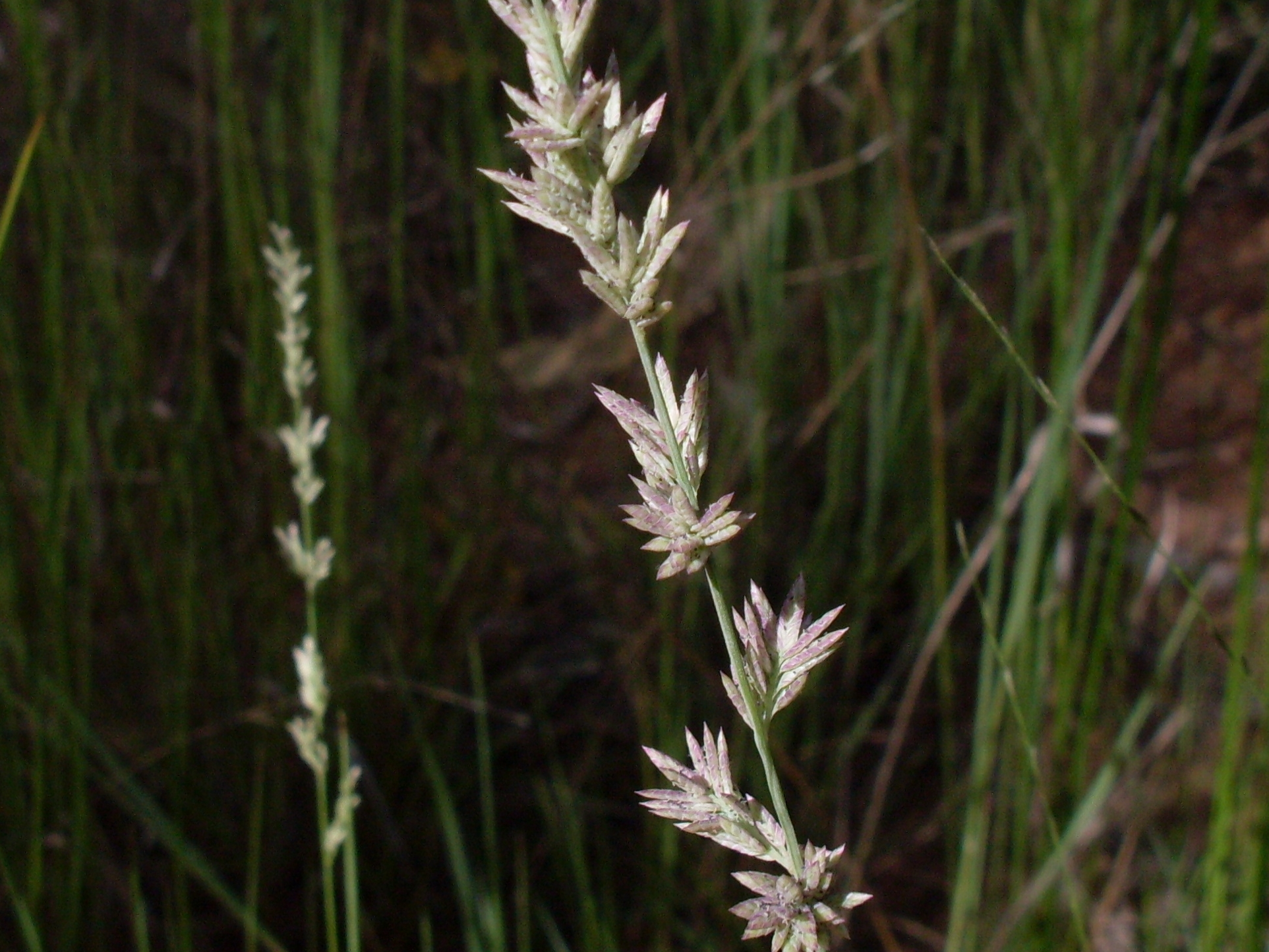
Eragrostis elongata (clustered lovegrass)

- Eragrostis ecarinata Lazarides – Northern Territory
- Eragrostis echinochloidea Stapf – Zimbabwe to S. Africa
- Eragrostis egregia Clayton – W. Tropical Africa
- Eragrostis elatior Stapf – Cape Province
- Eragrostis elegantissima Chiov. – W. Tropical Africa to Eritrea
- Eragrostis elliottii (Elliott) S.Watson – Central & S. U.S.A. to Honduras, Caribbean
- Eragrostis elongata (Willd.) J.Jacq. – Tropical & Subtrop. Asia to Australia
- Eragrostis episcopulus Lambdon, Darlow, Clubbe & Cope – St. Helena
- Eragrostis eriopoda Benth. – Australia
- Eragrostis erosa Scribn. ex Beal – S. Central U.S.A. to N. Mexico
- Eragrostis exasperata Peter – Kenya to S. Tropical Africa
- Eragrostis exelliana Launert – Tanzania to Zambia
- Eragrostis exigua Lazarides – Australia

== F ==
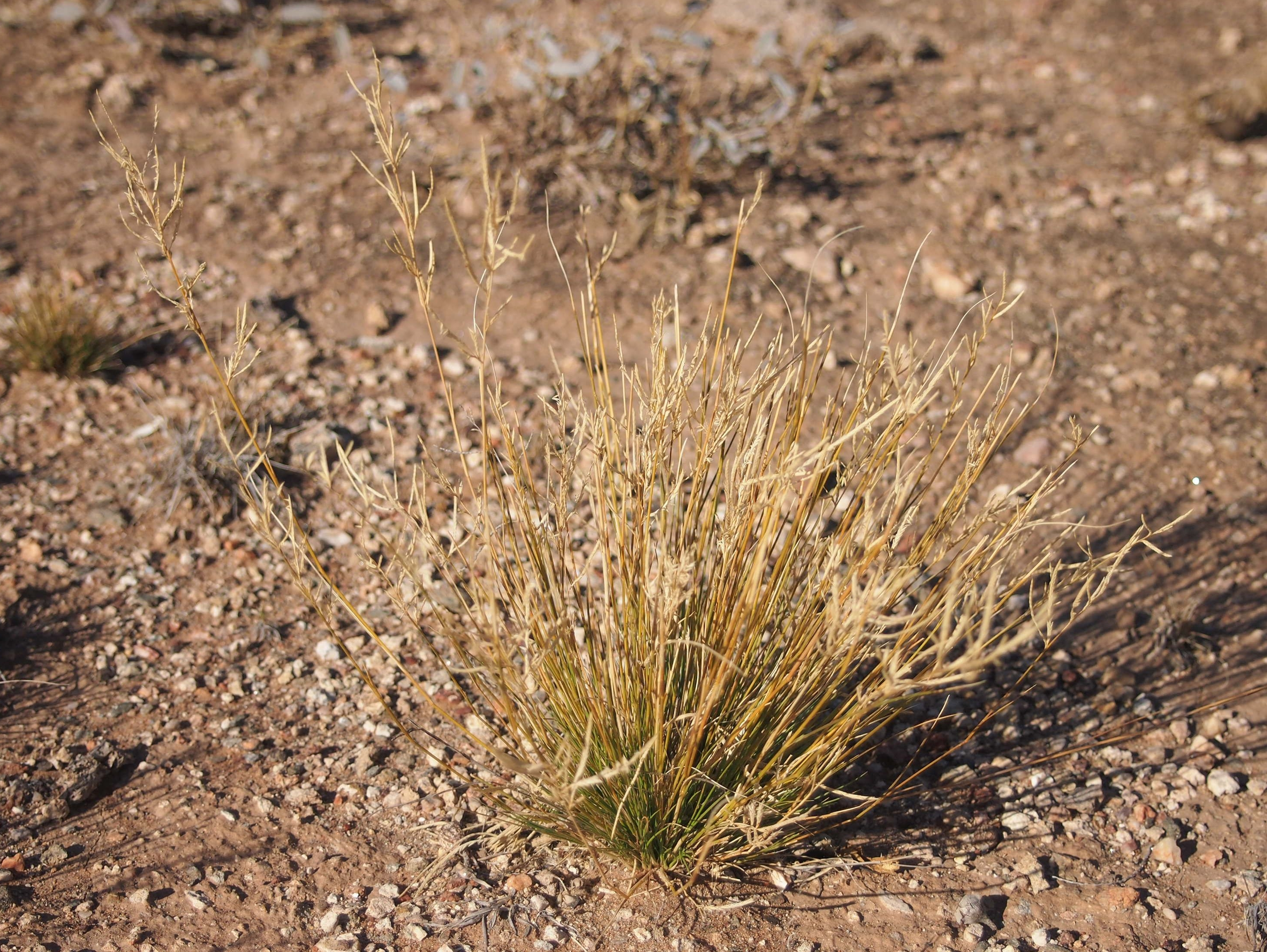
Eragrostis falcata

- Eragrostis falcata (Gaudich.) Steud. – Australia
- Eragrostis fallax Lazarides – N. Australia
- Eragrostis fastigiata Cope – Malawi (Mt. Mulanje)
- Eragrostis fauriei Ohwi – Taiwan
- Eragrostis fenshamii B.K.Simon – S. Queensland
- Eragrostis ferruginea (Thunb.) P.Beauv. – Himalaya to Temp. E. Asia
- Eragrostis filicaulis Lazarides – Australia
- Eragrostis fimbrillata Cope – Zambia
- Eragrostis flavicans Rendle – Tanzania to S. Tropical Africa
- Eragrostis fosbergii Whitney – Hawaiian Islands
- Eragrostis frankii Steud. – E. U.S.A. to Texas
- Eragrostis friesii Pilg. – S. Tropical Africa to Caprivi Strip

== G ==
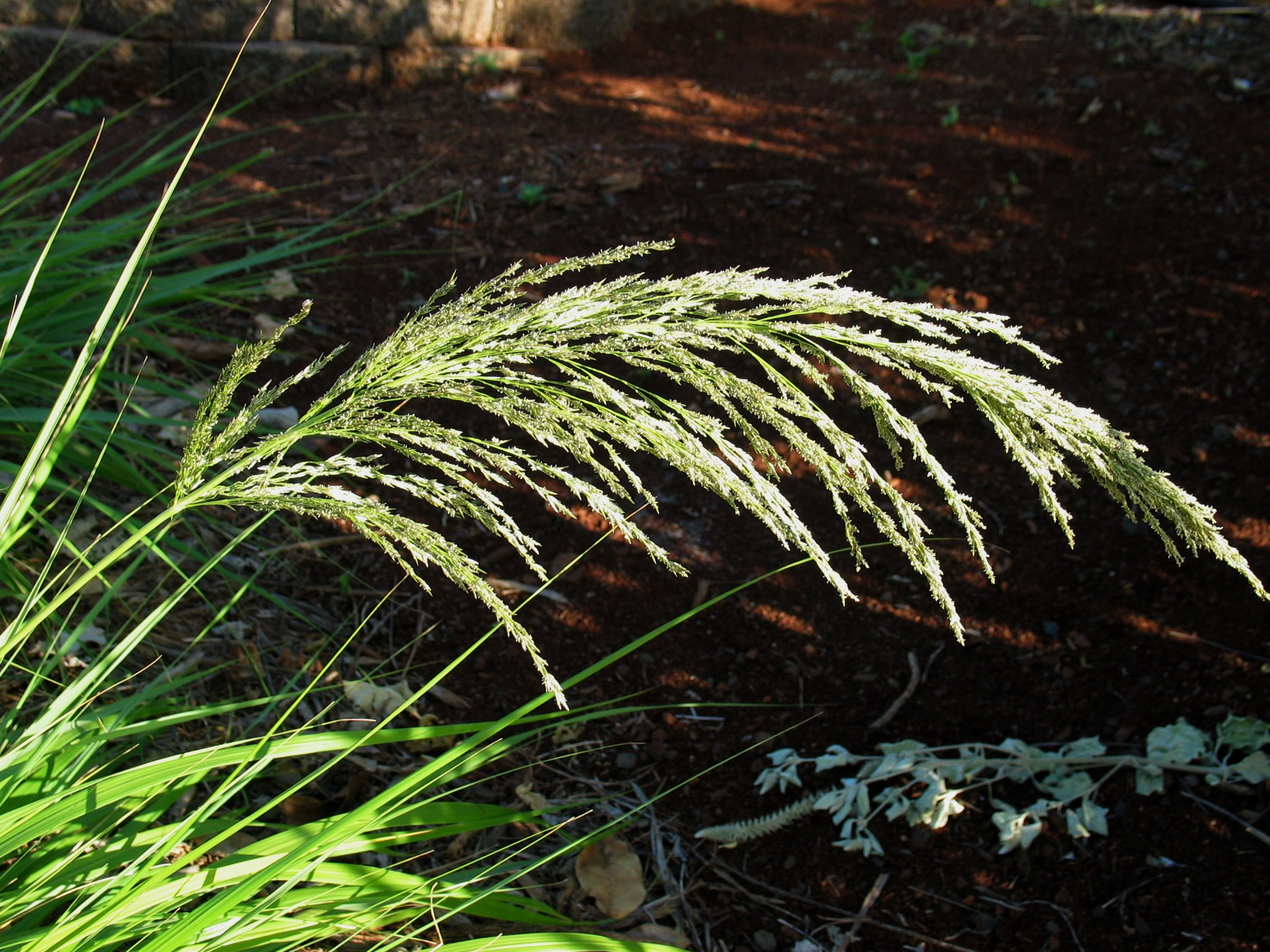
Eragrostis grandis

- Eragrostis gangetica (Roxb.) Steud. – Africa, Indian Subcontinent to Borneo
- Eragrostis georgii A.Chev. – Gabon
- Eragrostis glandulosipedata De Winter – S. Tropical & S. Africa
- Eragrostis glischra Launert – Zimbabwe
- Eragrostis gloeodes Ekman – Brazil (Mato Grosso do Sul)
- Eragrostis gloeophylla S.M.Phillips – E. Ethiopia to Somalia
- Eragrostis glutinosa (Sw.) Trin. – Cuba, Jamaica
- Eragrostis grandis Hildebr. – Hawaiian Islands
- Eragrostis guatemalensis Withersp. – Mexico to Guatemala
- Eragrostis guianensis Hitchc. – Venezuela to Guyana and N. Brazil
- Eragrostis gummiflua Nees – S. Tropical & S. Africa, Madagascar

== H ==
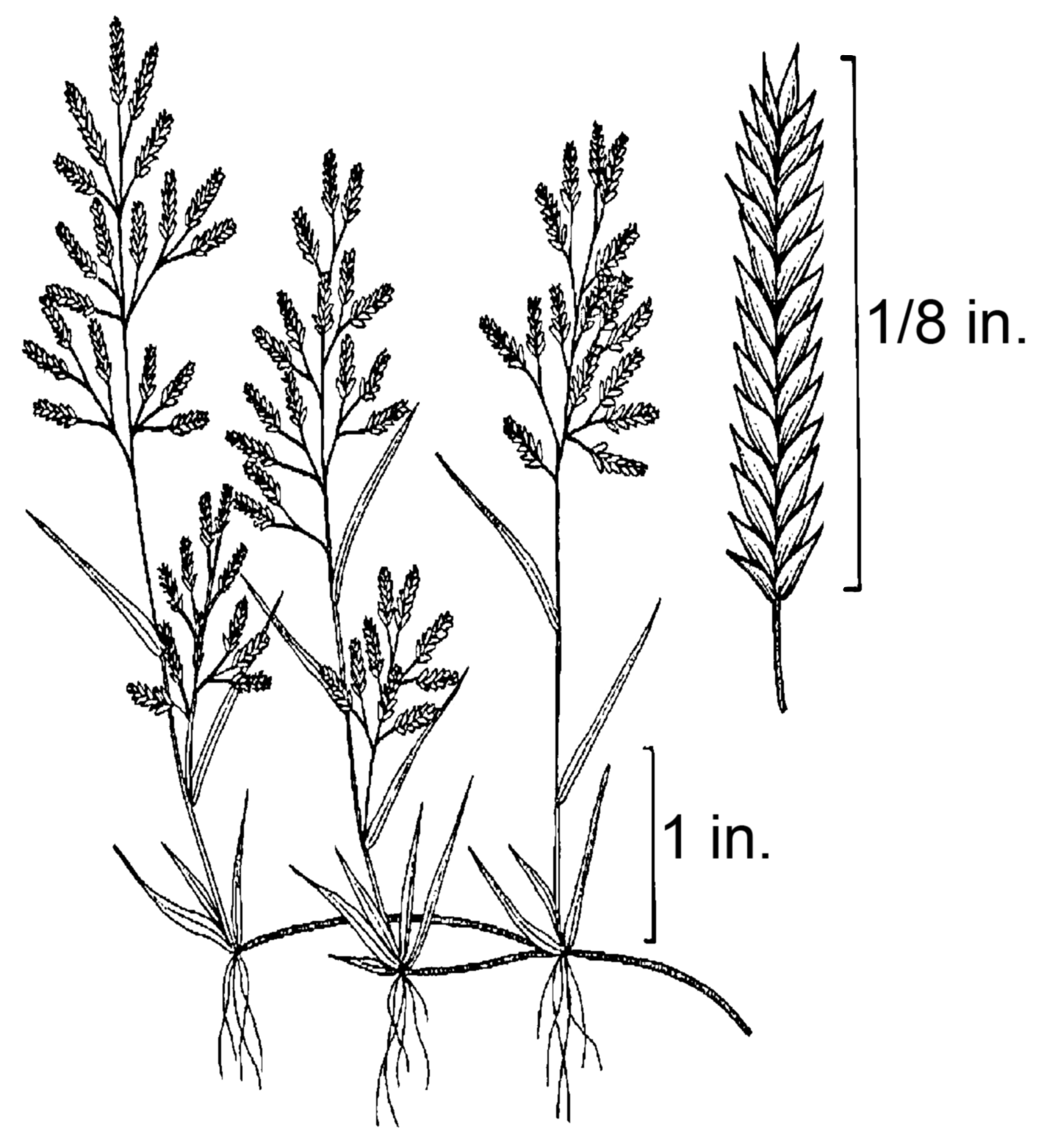
Illustration of Eragrostis hypnoides

- Eragrostis habrantha Rendle – S. Tropical & S. Africa
- Eragrostis hainanensis L.C.Chia – Hainan
- Eragrostis henryi Vivek, G.V.S.Murthy & V.J.Nair – India (Tamil Nadu)
- Eragrostis heteromera Stapf – Eritrea to S. Africa
- Eragrostis hierniana Rendle – Tanzania to S. Africa
- Eragrostis hildebrandtii Jedwabn. – Madagascar
- Eragrostis hirsuta (Michx.) Nees – Central & S.E. U.S.A. to Mexico
- Eragrostis hirta E.Fourn. – Mexico to Honduras
- Eragrostis hirticaulis Lazarides – N. Northern Territory
- Eragrostis hispida K.Schum. – South Sudan to S. Tropical Africa
- Eragrostis homblei De Wild. – Tanzania to Zambia
- Eragrostis homomalla Nees – Kenya to S. Africa
- Eragrostis hondurensis R.W.Pohl – S. Mexico to Central America
- Eragrostis hugoniana Rendle – China (Shaanxi)
- Eragrostis humbertii A.Camus – Madagascar
- Eragrostis humidicola Napper – DR Congo to E. Tropical Africa
- Eragrostis humifusa C.Cordem. – Réunion
- Eragrostis hypnoides (Lam.) Britton, Sterns & Poggenb. – America

== I–K ==
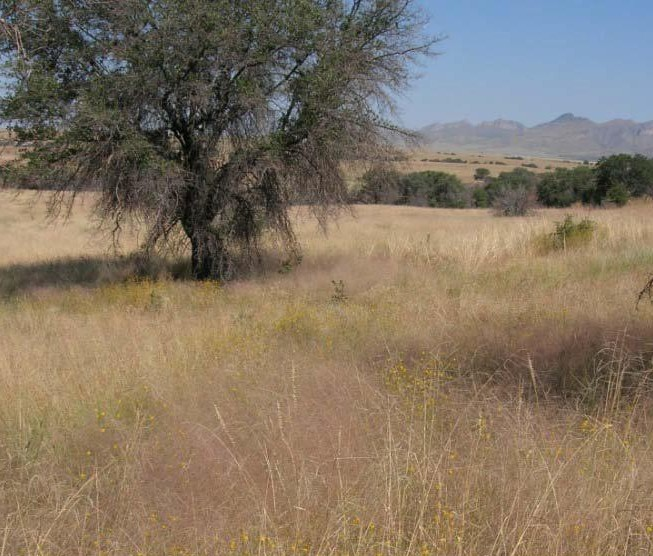
Eragrostis intermedia in Arizona

- Eragrostis inamoena K.Schum. – Kenya to S. Africa
- Eragrostis incrassata Cope – Somalia
- Eragrostis infecunda J.M.Black – S.E. Australia
- Eragrostis intermedia Hitchc. – Central & E. U.S.A. to Colombia
- Eragrostis interrupta P.Beauv. – E. Australia
- Eragrostis invalida Pilg. – W. & W. Central Tropical Africa
- Eragrostis jacobsiana B.K.Simon – N. Queensland
- Eragrostis jainii Vivek, G.V.S.Murthy & V.J.Nair – S.W. India
- Eragrostis japonica (Thunb.) Trin. – Tropical & Subtrop. Old World
- Eragrostis jerichoensis B.K.Simon – Central Queensland
- Eragrostis kennedyae F.Turner – Australia
- Eragrostis kingesii De Winter – Namibia to Cape Province
- Eragrostis kohorica Quézel – Chad (Tibesti)
- Eragrostis kuchariana S.M.Phillips – Somalia
- Eragrostis kuschelii Skottsb. – Desventuradas Islands

== L ==
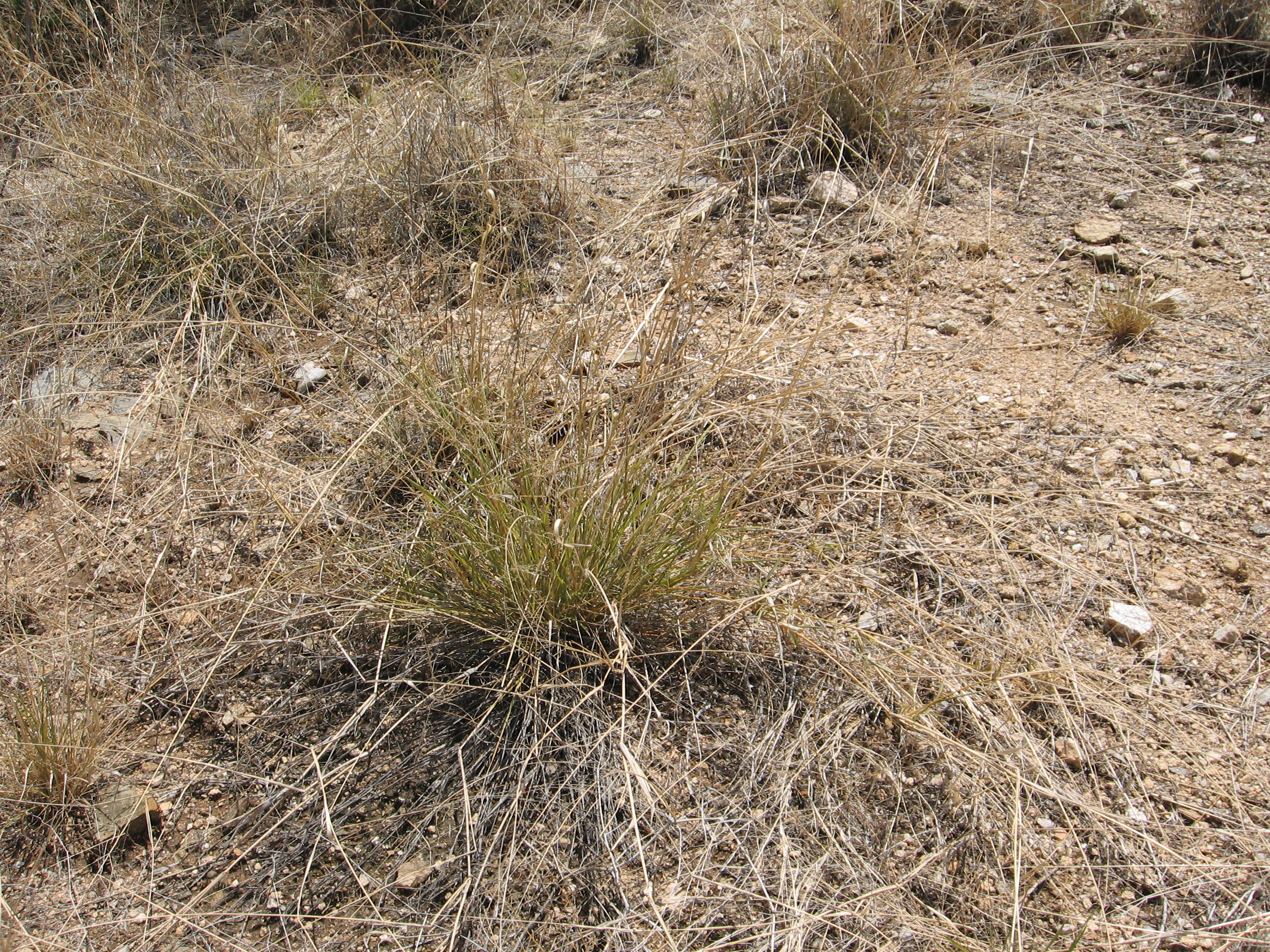
Eragrostis lehmanniana

- Eragrostis lacunaria F.Muell. – Australia
- Eragrostis laevissima Hack. – Namibia to Botswana
- Eragrostis lanicaulis Lazarides – Australia
- Eragrostis laniflora Benth. – Australia
- Eragrostis lanipes C.E.Hubb. – Western Australia to South Australia
- Eragrostis lappula Nees – Kenya to S. Africa
- Eragrostis lateritica Bosser – Madagascar
- Eragrostis latifolia Cope – Zimbabwe
- Eragrostis leersiiformis Launert – Tanzania to Namibia
- Eragrostis lehmanniana Nees – S. Tropical & S. Africa
- Eragrostis lepida (A.Rich.) Hochst. ex Steud. – N.E. Tropical Africa to Kenya, Arabian Peninsula
- Eragrostis lepidobasis Cope – Zambia
- Eragrostis leptocarpa Benth. – Australia
- Eragrostis leptophylla Hitchc. – Hawaiian Islands
- Eragrostis leptostachya (R.Br.) Steud. – E. & S.E. Australia
- Eragrostis leptotricha Cope – Zimbabwe to Botswana
- Eragrostis leucosticta Nees ex Döll – Brazil to Paraguay
- Eragrostis lichiangensis Jedwabn. – China (N.W. Yunnan)
- Eragrostis lingulata Clayton – W. Tropical Africa
- Eragrostis longifolia (A.Rich.) Hochst. ex Steud. – Ethiopia, Yemen
- Eragrostis longipedicellata B.K.Simon – S.E. Queensland
- Eragrostis longiramea Swallen – Mexico
- Eragrostis lugens Nees – Central & S.E. U.S.A. to El Salvador, S. Tropical America to Argentina
- Eragrostis lurida J.Presl – W. South America
- Eragrostis lutensis Cope – Somalia
- Eragrostis lutescens Scribn. – W. & W. Central U.S.A

== M ==
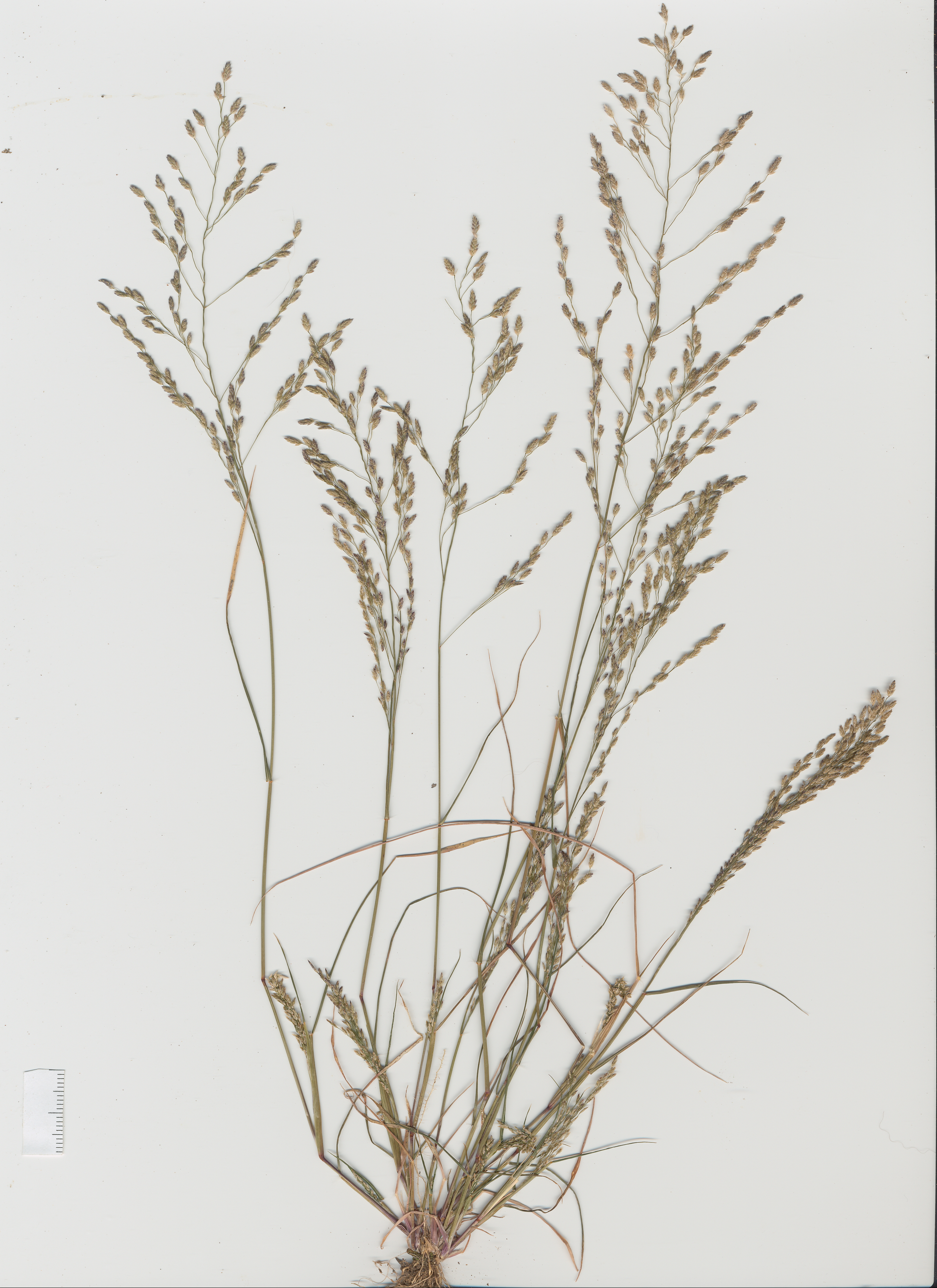
Eragrostis mexicana

- Eragrostis macilenta (A.Rich.) Steud. – Tropical Africa, Madagascar, S.W. Arabian Peninsula, India
- Eragrostis macrochlamys Pilg. – S. Africa
- Eragrostis macrothyrsa Hack. – Bolivia to Brazil (Mato Grosso di Sul, Santa Catarina)
- Eragrostis maderaspatana Bor – India, Sri Lanka
- Eragrostis magna Hitchc. – Peru
- Eragrostis mahrana Schweinf. – N.E. Tropical Africa to Arabian Peninsula
- Eragrostis majungensis A.Camus – Madagascar
- Eragrostis mandrarensis A.Camus – Madagascar
- Eragrostis mariae Launert – Zambia
- Eragrostis mauiensis Hitchc. – Hawaiian Islands
- Eragrostis maypurensis (Kunth) Steud. – Mexico to S. Tropical America
- Eragrostis membranacea Hack. – S. Tropical & S. Africa
- Eragrostis mexicana (Hornem.) Link – N. America to Argentina
- Eragrostis micrantha Hack. – Angola to S. Africa
- Eragrostis microcarpa Vickery – Central & E. Australia
- Eragrostis microsperma Rendle – Angola
- Eragrostis mildbraedii Pilg. – Kenya to Botswana
- Eragrostis milnei Launert ex Cope – Zambia
- Eragrostis minor Host – Old World
- Eragrostis moggii De Winter – Mozambique to S. Africa
- Eragrostis mokensis Pilg. – Nigeria to W. Central Tropical Africa
- Eragrostis mollior Pilg. – Uganda to S. Tropical Africa
- Eragrostis montana Balansa – Indo-China to W. Malesia
- Eragrostis monticola (Gaudich.) Hildebr. – Hawaiian Islands
- Eragrostis muerensis Pilg. – Tanzania to Zambia
- Eragrostis multicaulis Steud. – Tropical & Subtrop. Asia to Russian Far East
- Eragrostis multiflora Trin. – Tropical Africa to Myanmar

== N ==
- Eragrostis nairii Kalidass – N.E. India
- Eragrostis neesii Trin. – Brazil to N. Argentina
- Eragrostis nigra Nees ex Steud. – Caucasus to China and Indo-China
- Eragrostis nigricans (Kunth) Steud. – W. South America to N.W. Argentina
- Eragrostis nilgiriensis Vivek, G.V.S.Murthy & V.J.Nair – India (Tamil Nadu)
- Eragrostis nindensis Ficalho & Hiern – Tanzania to S. Africa
- Eragrostis nutans (Retz.) Nees ex Steud. – Indian Subcontinent to Malesia

== O ==
- Eragrostis obtusa Munro ex Ficalho & Hiern – S. Africa
- Eragrostis olida Lazarides – N. Australia
- Eragrostis oligostachya Cope – Zambia
- Eragrostis olivacea K.Schum. – Ethiopia to S. Tropical Africa
- Eragrostis omahekensis De Winter – Namibia
- Eragrostis oreophila L.H.Harv. – Mexico
- Eragrostis orthoclada Hack. – Bolivia to N. Argentina

== P ==
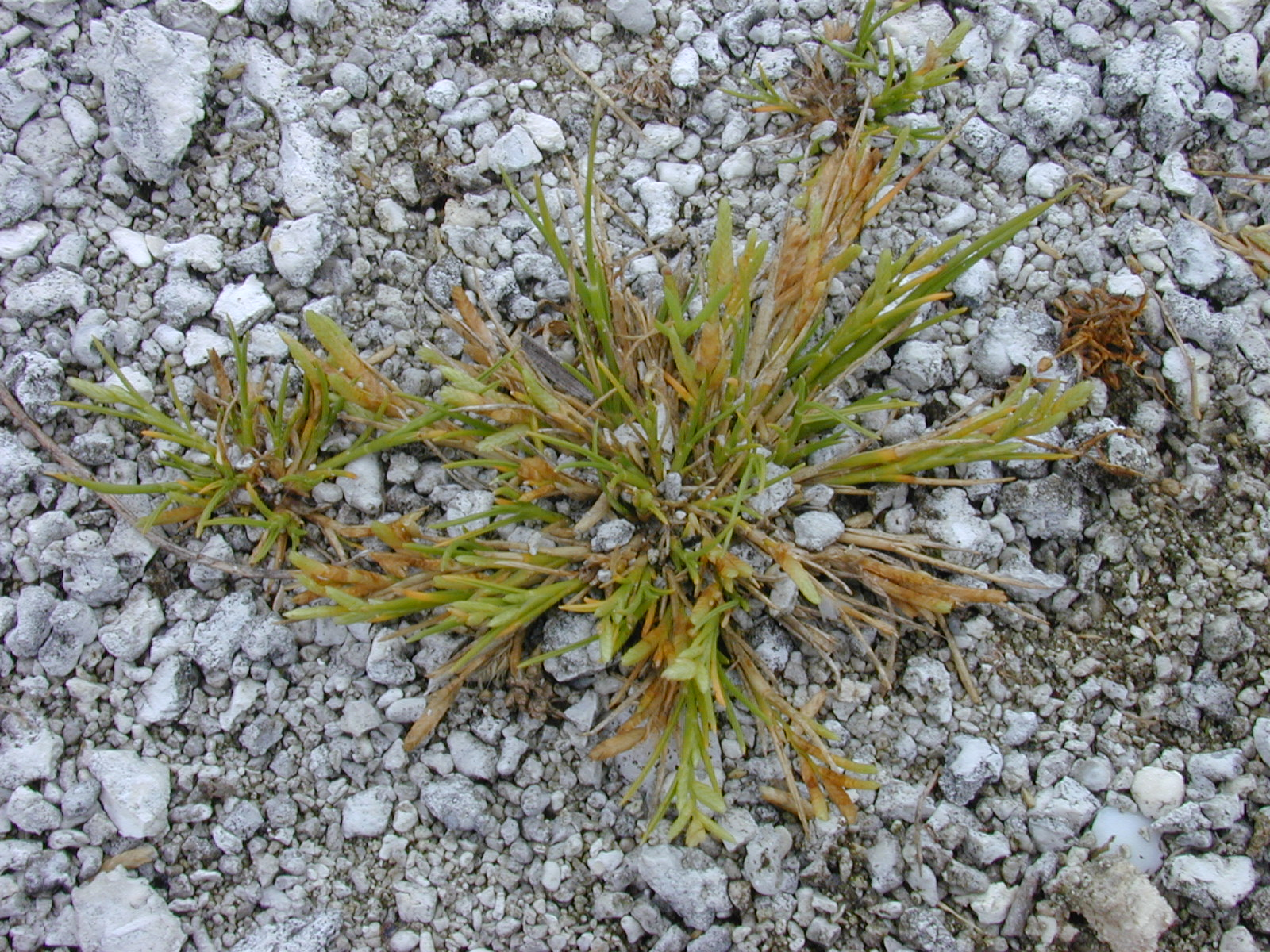
Eragrostis paupera

- Eragrostis pallens Hack. – S. Tropical & S. Africa
- Eragrostis palmeri S.Watson – S. Central U.S.A. to Mexico
- Eragrostis palustris Zon – Cameroon
- Eragrostis paniciformis (A.Braun) Steud. – Eritrea to Zambia
- Eragrostis papposa (Roem. & Schult.) Steud. – S.E. Spain to N.W. Africa, N.E. & E. Tropical Africa to Myanmar
- Eragrostis paradoxa Launert – S. Tropical Africa
- Eragrostis parviflora (R.Br.) Trin. – Australia, New Guinea to New Caledonia
- Eragrostis pascua S.M.Phillips – Eritrea to Ethiopia
- Eragrostis pastoensis (Kunth) Trin. – S. Tropical America
- Eragrostis patens Oliv. – Congo, Kenya to S. Africa
- Eragrostis patentipilosa Hack. – Ethiopia to S. Africa
- Eragrostis patentissima Hack. – S. Africa
- Eragrostis patula (Kunth) Steud. – Ecuador
- Eragrostis paupera Jedwabn. – Hawaiian Islands
- Eragrostis pectinacea (Michx.) Nees – America
- Eragrostis perbella K.Schum. – Somalia to Tanzania
- Eragrostis perennans Keng – S. China to Hainan
- Eragrostis perennis Döll – Bolivia to Brazil and N.E. Argentina
- Eragrostis pergracilis S.T.Blake – Australia
- Eragrostis perplexa L.H.Harv. – W. Central & Central U.S.A. to N.E. Mexico
- Eragrostis perrieri A.Camus – Madagascar
- Eragrostis peruviana (Jacq.) Trin. – Peru to N. Chile, Desventuradas Islands
- Eragrostis petraea Lazarides – N. Western Australia, N. Northern Territory
- Eragrostis petrensis Renvoize & Longhi-Wagner – Brazil (Bahia, Minas Gerais, Rio de Janeiro)
- Eragrostis phyllacantha Cope – Zimbabwe to Botswana
- Eragrostis pilgeri Fedde – Peru (Ancash, Cajamarca)
- Eragrostis pilgeriana Dinter ex Pilg. – Angola to S. Africa
- Eragrostis pilosa (L.) P.Beauv. – Old World
- Eragrostis pilosissima Link – S.E. China to Vietnam, Taiwan
- Eragrostis pilosiuscula Ohwi – S.E. China, Taiwan
- Eragrostis plana Nees – S. Tropical & S. Africa, Madagascar
- Eragrostis planiculmis Nees – S. Tropical & S. Africa
- Eragrostis plumbea Scribn. ex Beal – Mexico
- Eragrostis plurigluma C.E.Hubb. – W. Tropical Africa to Zambia
- Eragrostis plurinodis Swallen – Venezuela to Guyana and N. Brazil
- Eragrostis pobeguinii C.E.Hubb. – W. Tropical Africa to Cameroon
- Eragrostis poculiformis Cope – Tanzania
- Eragrostis polytricha Nees – Florida, Texas to S. Tropical America
- Eragrostis porosa Nees – Ethiopia to S. Africa, Arabian Peninsula
- Eragrostis potamophila Lazarides – N. Western Australia to N. Northern Territory
- Eragrostis pringlei Mattei – Mexico
- Eragrostis procumbens Nees – Zimbabwe to S. Africa
- Eragrostis prolifera (Sw.) Steud. – Tropical & Subtrop. America, W. Trop. Africa to Angola
- Eragrostis propinqua Steud. – Mauritius
- Eragrostis psammophila S.M.Phillips – Somalia
- Eragrostis pseudopoa C.E.Hubb. – S.W. Tanzania, Northern Province
- Eragrostis pubescens (R.Br.) Steud. – Thailand to N. & E. Australia
- Eragrostis punctiglandulosa Cope – Zambia (Kafue Flats)
- Eragrostis purpurascens (Spreng.) Schult. – Lesser Antilles, S. Brazil to Uruguay
- Eragrostis pusilla Hack. – S. Tropical & S. Africa
- Eragrostis pycnantha (Phil.) Parodi ex Nicora – Chile
- Eragrostis pycnostachys Clayton – Kenya
- Eragrostis pygmaea De Winter – Namibia

== R ==
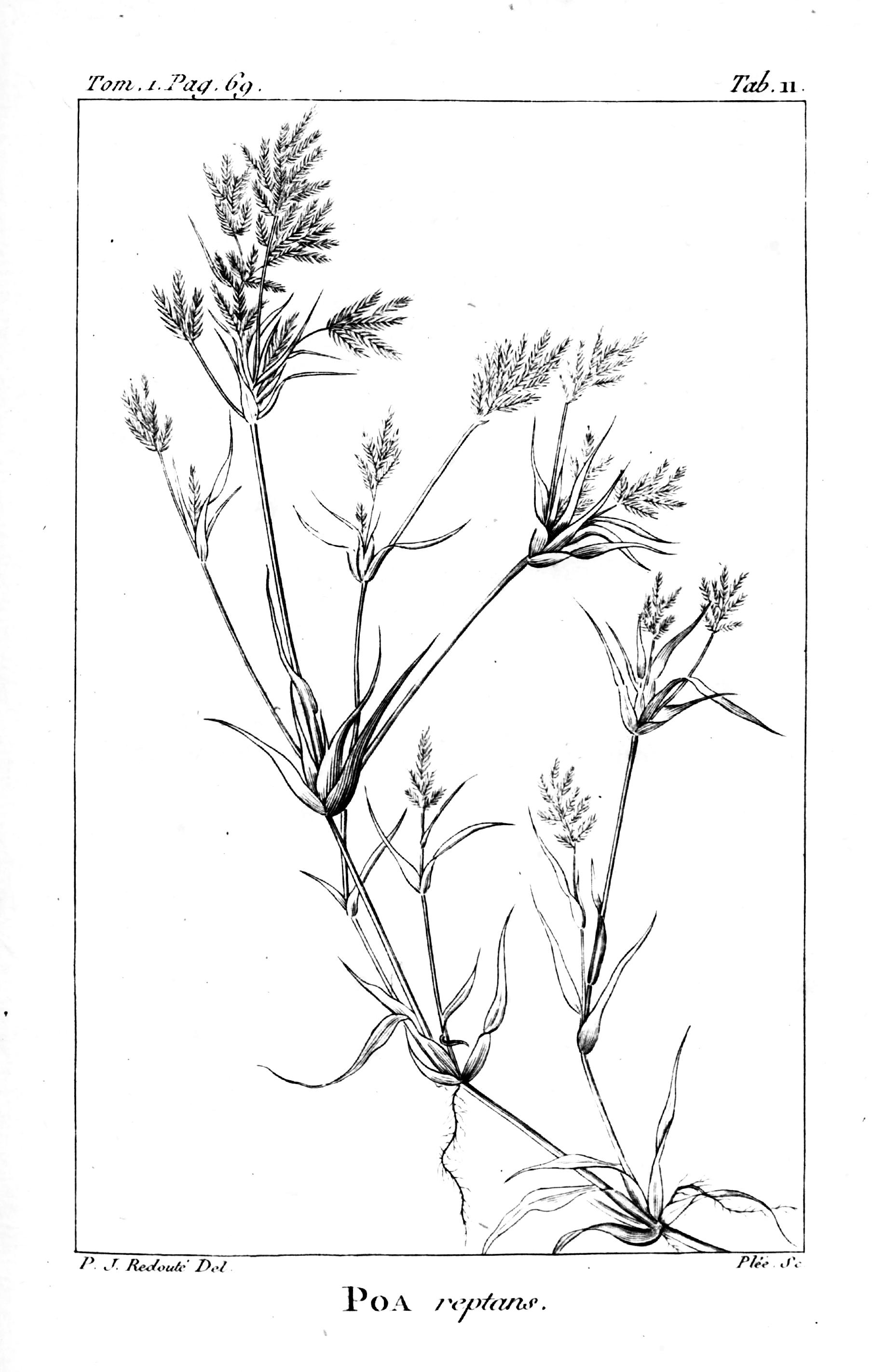
Illustration of Eragrostis reptans

- Eragrostis racemosa (Thunb.) Steud. – Eritrea to S. Africa, Seychelles, Madagascar
- Eragrostis raynaliana Lebrun – Cameroon
- Eragrostis refracta (Muhl.) Scribn. – E. Central & S.E. U.S.A., Suriname
- Eragrostis rejuvenescens Rendle – S. DR Congo to Angola
- Eragrostis remotiflora De Winter – S. Africa
- Eragrostis reptans (Michx.) Nees – Central & S.E. U.S.A. to E. Mexico
- Eragrostis retinens Hack. & Arechav. – S. Brazil to N.E. Argentina
- Eragrostis rigidiuscula Domin – N. Australia
- Eragrostis riobrancensis Judz. & P.M.Peterson – Guyana to N. Brazil
- Eragrostis riparia (Willd.) Nees – Tropical Asia
- Eragrostis rivalis H.Scholz – E. Europe
- Eragrostis rogersii C.E.Hubb. – S. Tropical Africa to Botswana
- Eragrostis rojasii Hack. – Brazil to N.E. Argentina
- Eragrostis rotifer Rendle – Tanzania to S. Africa
- Eragrostis rottleri Stapf – India (S.E. & S. Tamil Nadu)
- Eragrostis rufescens Schult. – Mexico to Paraguay
- Eragrostis rufinerva L.C.Chia – Hainan

== S ==
- Eragrostis sabinae Launert – Namibia
- Eragrostis sabulicola Pilger ex Jedwabn. – W. Central Tropical Africa
- Eragrostis sabulosa (Steud.) Schweick. – Cape Province
- Eragrostis sambiranensis A.Camus – Madagascar
- Eragrostis santapaui K.G.Bhat & Nagendran – India (Karnataka)
- Eragrostis saresberiensis Launert – Tanzania to Zimbabwe
- Eragrostis sarmentosa (Thunb.) Trin. – Chad (Tibesti), S. Tropical & S. Africa, Madagascar
- Eragrostis saxatilis Hemsl. – S.W. & Central St. Helena
- Eragrostis scabriflora Swallen – Pacific
- Eragrostis scaligera Steud. – French Guiana to Brazil
- Eragrostis schultzii Benth. – N. Australia
- Eragrostis schweinfurthii Chiov. – Eritrea to Malawi, S.W. Arabian Peninsula, Sri Lanka
- Eragrostis sclerantha Nees – Tanzania to S. Africa
- Eragrostis sclerophylla Trin. – Brazil (Minas Gerais)
- Eragrostis scopelophila Pilg. – Namibia
- Eragrostis scotelliana Rendle – W. & W. Central Tropical Africa
- Eragrostis secundiflora J.Presl – Central & S. U.S.A. to S. Tropical America
- Eragrostis seminuda Trin. – Brazil to N.E. Argentina
- Eragrostis sennii Chiov. – Somalia to Kenya
- Eragrostis sericata Cope – Mozambique
- Eragrostis sessilispica Buckley – Central U.S.A. to N.E. Mexico
- Eragrostis setifolia Nees – Australia
- Eragrostis setulifera Pilg. – Tanzania to Zambia
- Eragrostis silveana Swallen – S. Texas to Mexico
- Eragrostis simpliciflora (J.Presl) Steud. – S.E. Mexico to Central America
- Eragrostis singuaensis Pilg. – Cameroon
- Eragrostis solida Nees – Bolivia to Brazil and N.E. Argentina
- Eragrostis soratensis Jedwabn. – W. South America
- Eragrostis sororia Domin – E. Australia
- Eragrostis spartinoides Steud. – N. & E. Australia to Pacific
- Eragrostis speciosa (Roem. & Schult.) Steud. – Australia
- Eragrostis spectabilis (Pursh) Steud. – S. Canada to N.E. Mexico

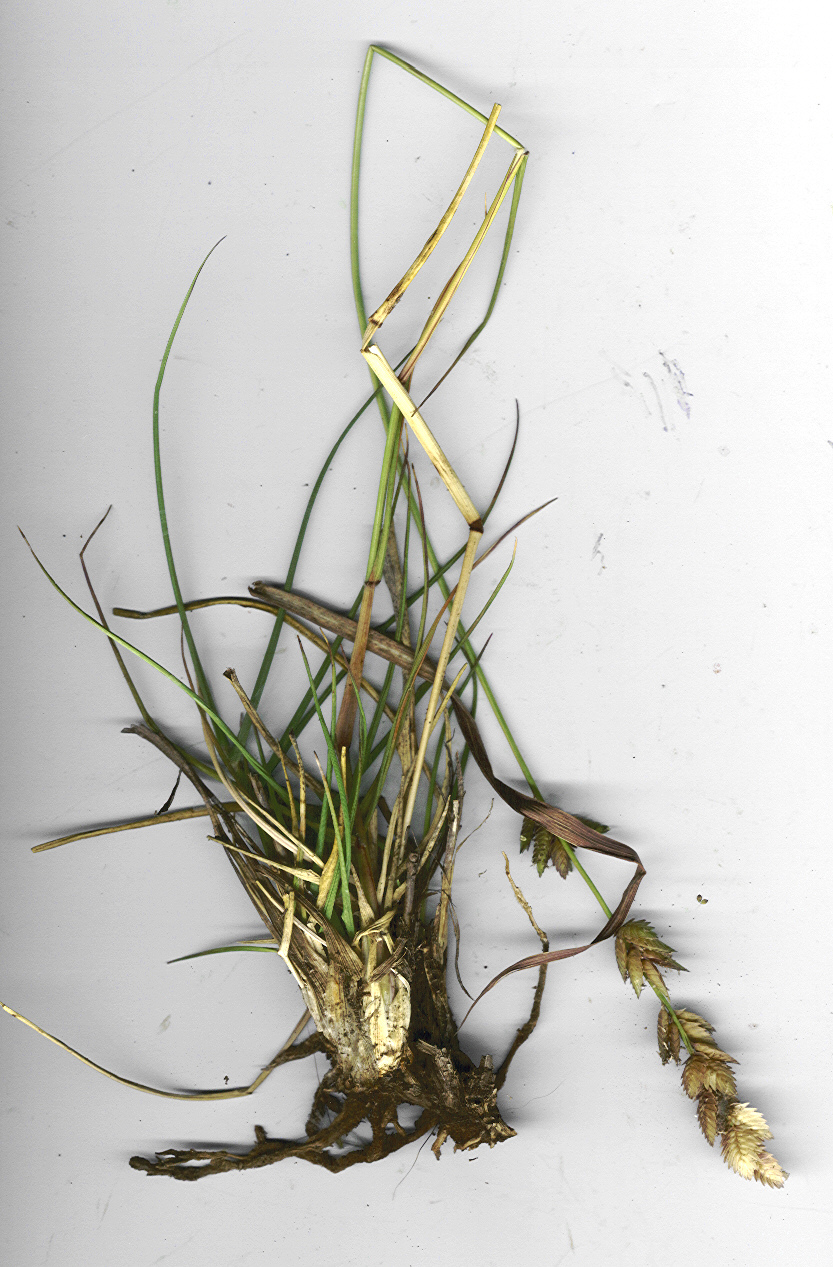
Eragrostis superba

- Eragrostis spicata Vasey – Texas to N. Mexico, Paraguay to N. Argentina
- Eragrostis spicigera Cope – Zambia
- Eragrostis squamata (Lam.) Steud. – Cape Verde, W. Tropical Africa to Chad
- Eragrostis stagnalis Lazarides – N. Northern Territory to Queensland
- Eragrostis stapfii De Winter – S. Tropical & S. Africa
- Eragrostis stenostachya (R.Br.) Steud. – N. Northern Territory to N. & N.E. Queensland
- Eragrostis stenothyrsa Pilg. – Namibia
- Eragrostis sterilis Domin – N. & E. Australia
- Eragrostis stolonifera A.Camus – Madagascar
- Eragrostis subaequiglumis Renvoize – Madagascar, Aldabra
- Eragrostis subglandulosa Cope – Botswana to Namibia
- Eragrostis subsecunda (Lam.) E.Fourn. – India to S. China and N.W. Pacific
- Eragrostis subtilis Lazarides – Central Australia
- Eragrostis superba Peyr. – Congo to Ethiopia and S. Africa
- Eragrostis surreyana K.A.Sheph. & Trudgen – N.W. Western Australia
- Eragrostis swallenii Hitchc. – S. Texas to Mexico
- Eragrostis sylviae Cope – Malawi (Mt. Mulanje)

== T ==
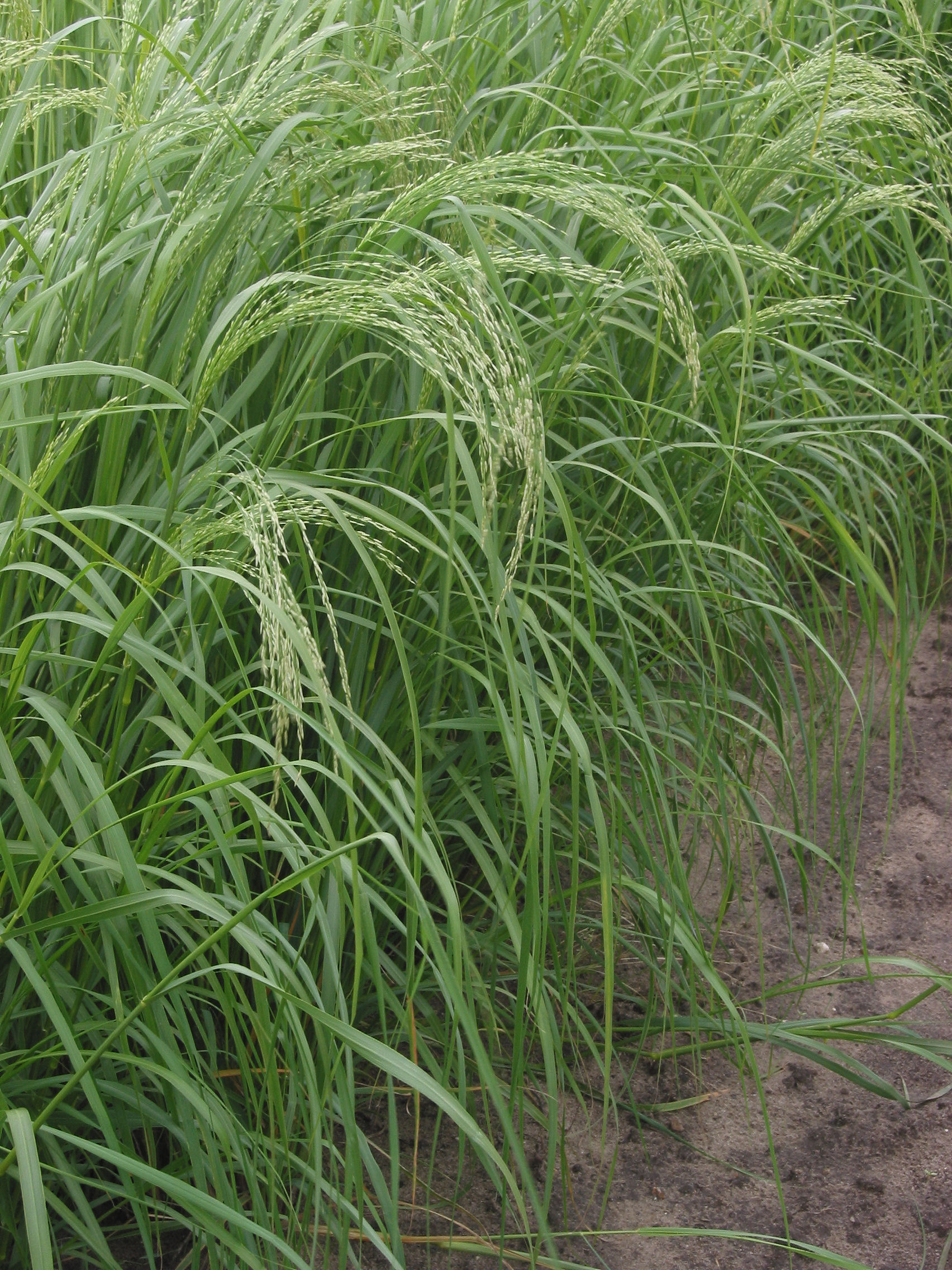
Eragrostis tef (teff)

- Eragrostis tef (Zuccagni) Trotter – N.E. & E. Tropical Africa, Arabian Peninsula
- Eragrostis tenellula (Kunth) Steud. – Australia
- Eragrostis tenuifolia (A.Rich.) Hochst. ex Steud. – Tropical & Subtrop. Old World
- Eragrostis tephrosanthos Schult. – America
- Eragrostis terecaulis Renvoize – Bolivia
- Eragrostis theinlwinii Bor – Myanmar
- Eragrostis thollonii Franch. – W. Central & S. Tropical Africa
- Eragrostis trachyantha Cope – Somalia
- Eragrostis trachycarpa (Benth.) Domin – S.E. Queensland to Central & E. Victoria
- Eragrostis tracyi Hitchc. – Florida
- Eragrostis tremula Hochst. ex Steud. – Tropical Africa, Afghanistan to Indo-China
- Eragrostis triangularis Henrard – Paraguay
- Eragrostis trichocolea Arechav. – Brazil to N. Argentina
- Eragrostis trichodes (Nutt.) Alph.Wood – Central & E. U.S.A
- Eragrostis tridentata Cope – Somalia
- Eragrostis trimucronata Napper – Tanzania
- Eragrostis triquetra Lazarides – Queensland
- Eragrostis truncata Hack. – S. Africa
- Eragrostis turgida (Schumach.) De Wild. – W. Tropical Africa to W. Ethiopia

== U ==
- Eragrostis udawnensis Ohwi – Thailand
- Eragrostis unioloides (Retz.) Nees ex Steud. – Tropical & Subtrop. Asia to N. & E. Queensland
- Eragrostis urbaniana Hitchc. – Caribbean
- Eragrostis usambarensis Napper – Tanzania
- Eragrostis uvida Lazarides – N. Australia
- Eragrostis uzondoiensis Sánchez-Ken – Tanzania

== V ==
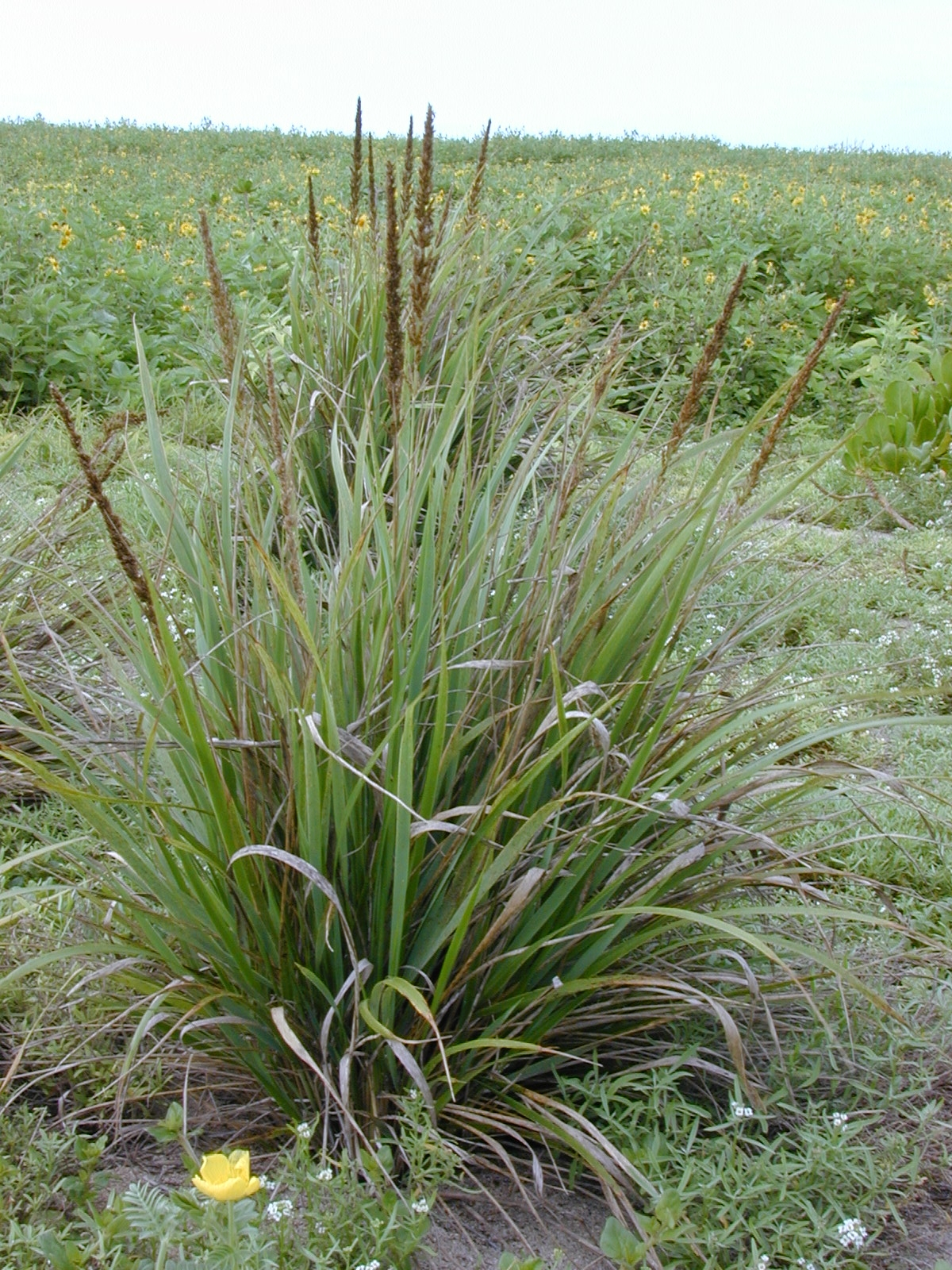
Eragrostis variabilis

- Eragrostis vacillans Rendle – Angola
- Eragrostis vallsiana Boechat & Longhi-Wagner – Brazil
- Eragrostis variabilis (Gaudich.) Steud. – Hawaiian Islands
- Eragrostis variegata Welw. ex Rendle – Angola
- Eragrostis vatovae (Chiov.) S.M.Phillips – Somalia
- Eragrostis venustula Cope – S. Tropical Africa to Namibia
- Eragrostis vernix Boechat & Longhi-Wagner – N.E. Brazil
- Eragrostis viguieri A.Camus – Madagascar
- Eragrostis virescens J.Presl – W. Canada to Central Mexico, Venezuela to S. South America
- Eragrostis viscosa (Retz.) Trin. – Tropical & S. Africa, S. Arabian Peninsula, Trop. Asia
- Eragrostis volkensii Pilg. – Tropical & S. Africa
- Eragrostis vulcanica Jedwabn. – Bismarck Arch

== W–Z ==
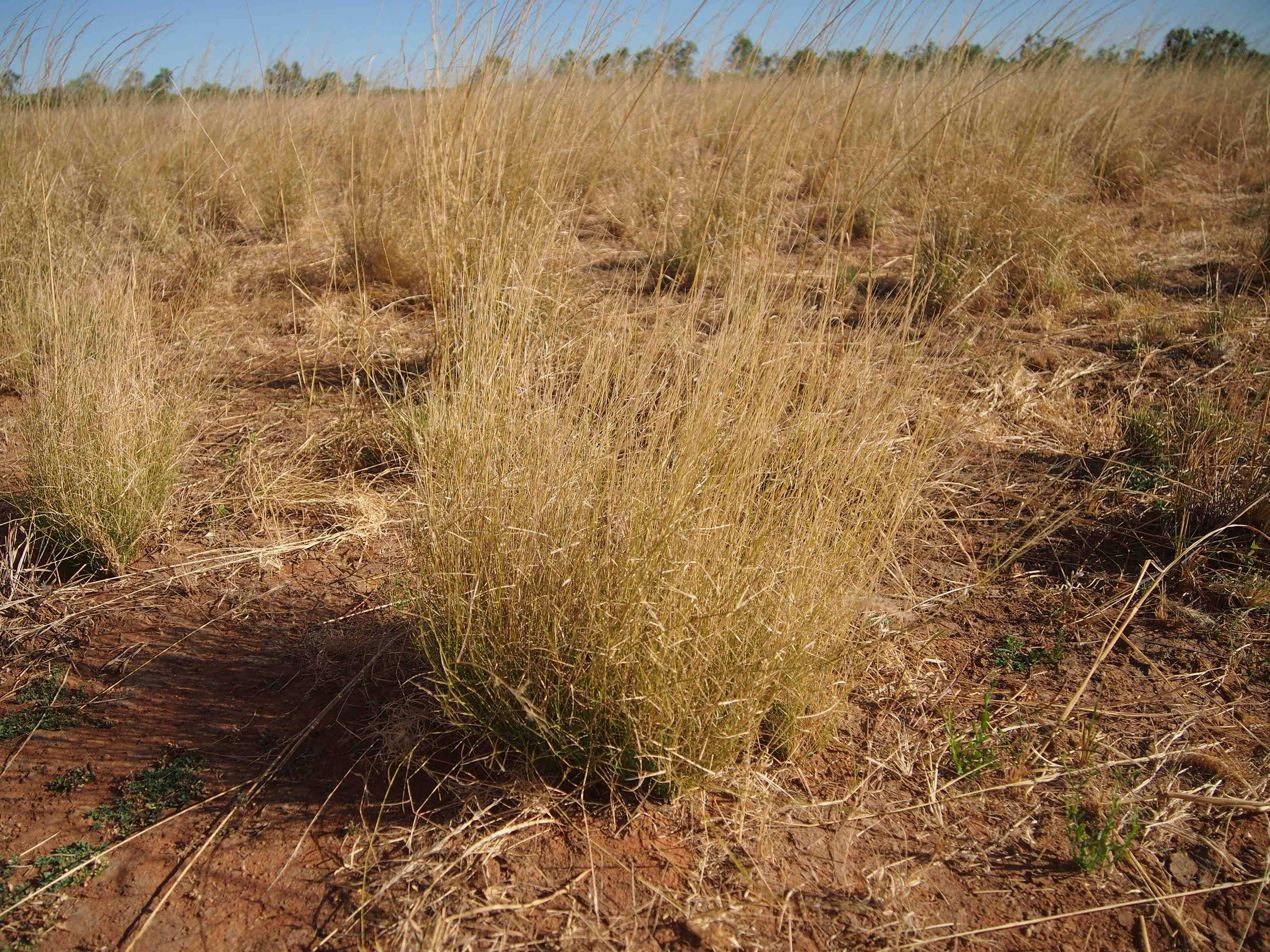
Eragrostis xerophila

- Eragrostis walteri Pilg. – Namibia
- Eragrostis warburgii Hack. – S. & E. Malesia to New Guinea
- Eragrostis weberbaueri Pilg. – Peru to N. Chile
- Eragrostis welwitschii Rendle – Tropical Africa
- Eragrostis xerophila Domin – Australia
- Eragrostis zeylanica Nees & Meyen – Indian Subcontinent to Indo-China
