= Sporobolus pallidus =

Sporobolus pallidus can refer to the following grass species:

- Sporobolus pallidus Lindl., a synonym of Eragrostis tenellula (Kunth) Steud.
- Sporobolus pallidus (Nees ex Trin.) Boiss., a synonym of Sporobolus ioclados (Nees ex Trin.) Nees
