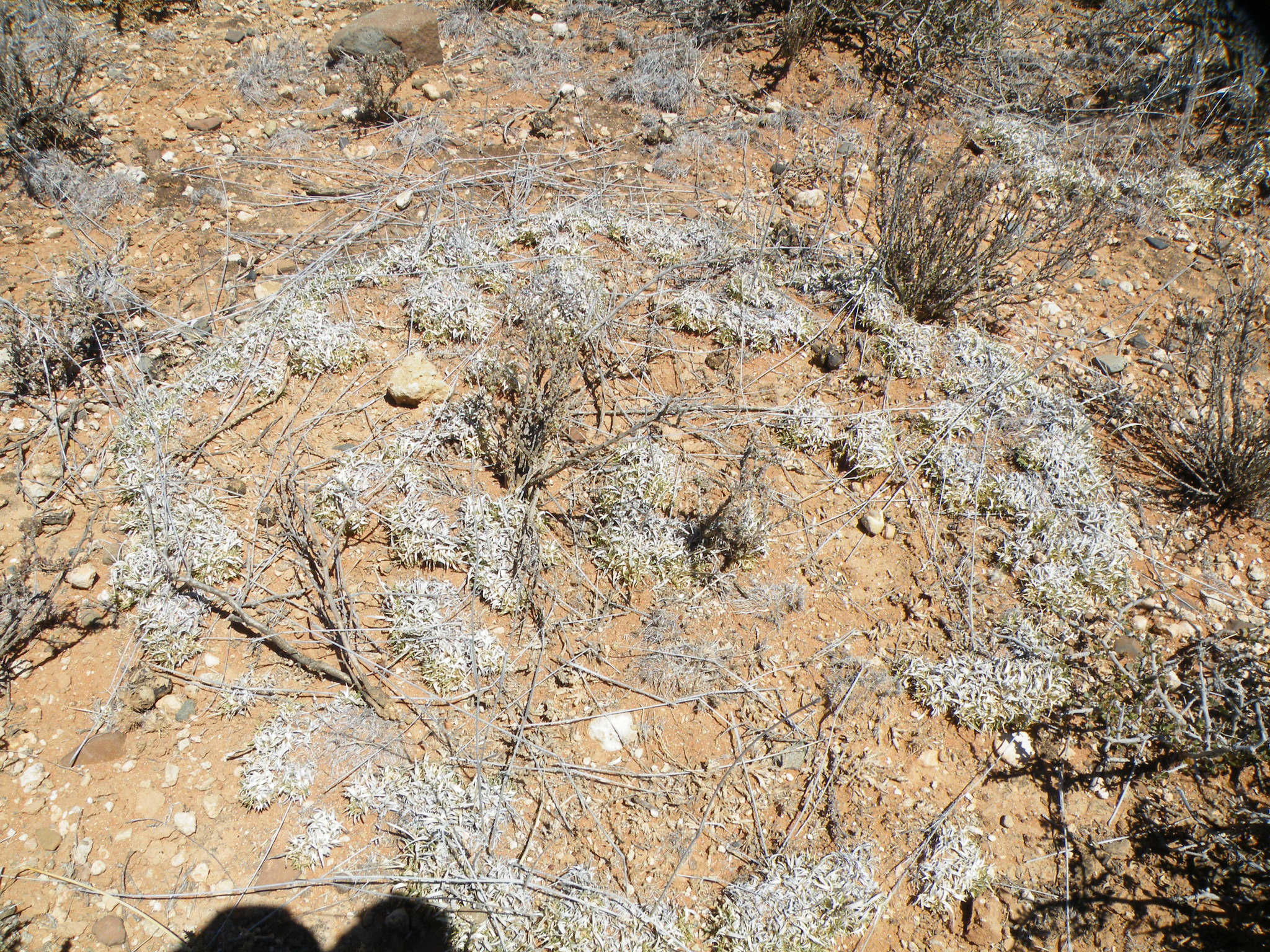

Scientific classification
- Kingdom: Plantae
- Clade: Embryophytes
- Clade: Tracheophytes
- Clade: Spermatophytes
- Clade: Angiosperms
- Clade: Monocots
- Clade: Commelinids
- Order: Poales
- Family: Poaceae
- Subfamily: Chloridoideae
- Genus: Eragrostis
- Species: E. truncata

Binomial name
- Eragrostis truncata Hack.

= Eragrostis truncata =

Species of plant

Eragrostis truncata (Afrikaans: bloupolgras, "blue tussock") is a species of grass in the family Poaceae that is native to Namibia, Botswana, and South Africa. Found most abundantly in the Nama Karoo, the plant is registered under the SANBI Red List as "safe" (LC).

The root stock is short and branched, and the plant is a perennial with clumped seeds.

In the Gemsbok National Park portion of Kgalagadi Transfrontier Park, the species is found mainly on the banks of the Nossob River, along with such grasses as Enneapogon desvauxii, Stipagrostis obtusa, Eragrostis echinochloidea, Sporobolus rangei, and Schmidtia kalahariensis. It can also be found on the basin floor.

== Agriculture ==
This sweet grass remains edible in the winter months, when more acidic grasses become tasteless and nutritionally poor.
