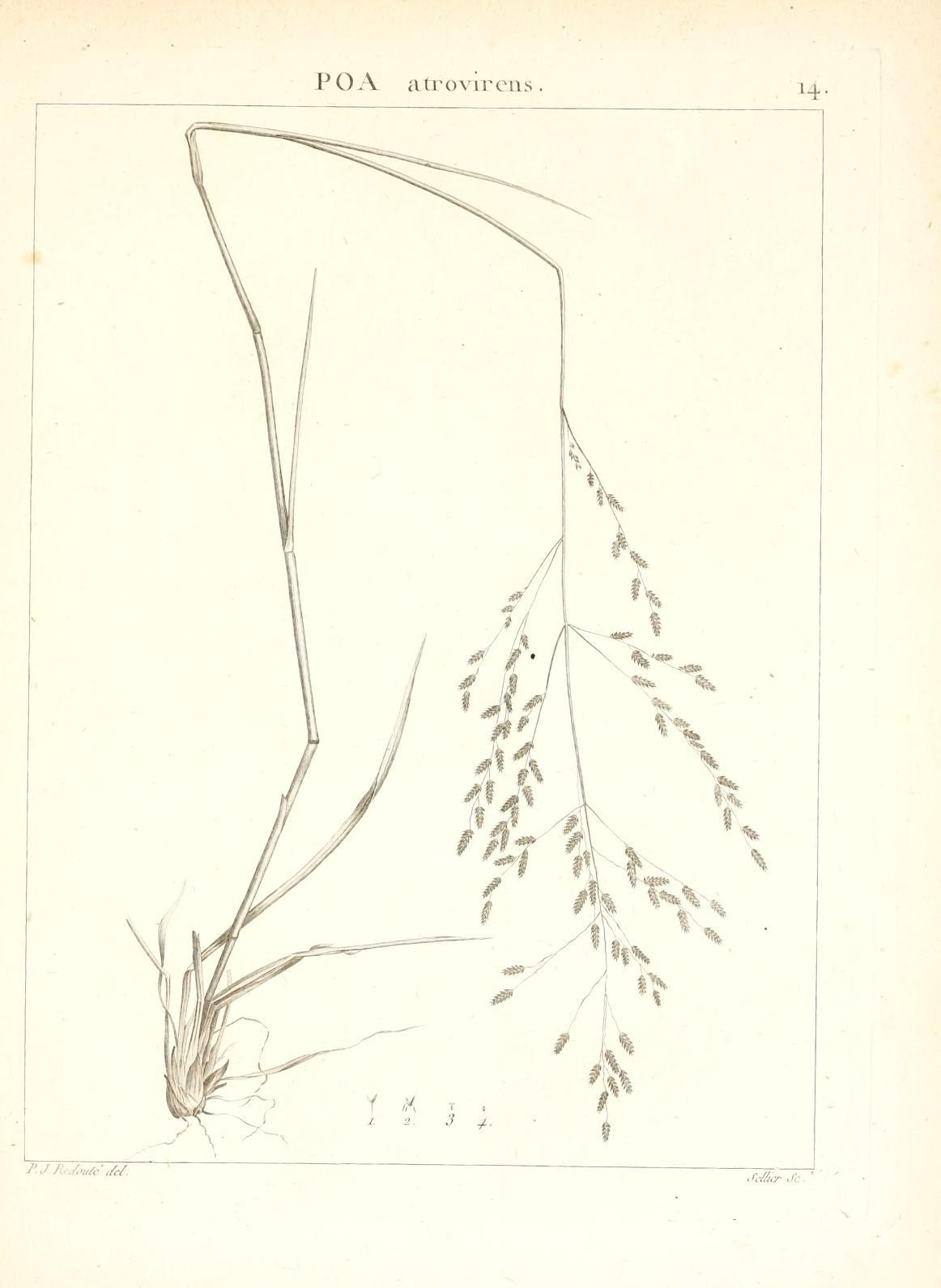

Conservation status
- Least Concern (IUCN 3.1)

Scientific classification
- Kingdom: Plantae
- Clade: Tracheophytes
- Clade: Angiosperms
- Clade: Monocots
- Clade: Commelinids
- Order: Poales
- Family: Poaceae
- Subfamily: Chloridoideae
- Genus: Eragrostis
- Species: E. atrovirens

Binomial name
- Eragrostis atrovirens (Desf.) Trin. ex Steud. 1840

Synonyms
- Briza elegans Osbeck; Eragrostis atrovirens var. 'hesperidum Maire; Eragrostis atroviridis Maire; Eragrostis biformis (Kunth) Benth.; Eragrostis bromoides Jedwabn.; Eragrostis luzoniensis Steud.; Eragrostis multiflora var. biformis (Kunth) A.Chev.; Eragrostis multinodis B.S.Sun & S.Wang; Eragrostis sudanica A.Chev.; Poa atrovirens Desf.; Poa biformis Kunth

= Eragrostis atrovirens =

Species of grass

Eragrostis atrovirens is a species of grass. It is found in the tropical and subtropical parts of the world.

== See also ==
- List of Eragrostis species
