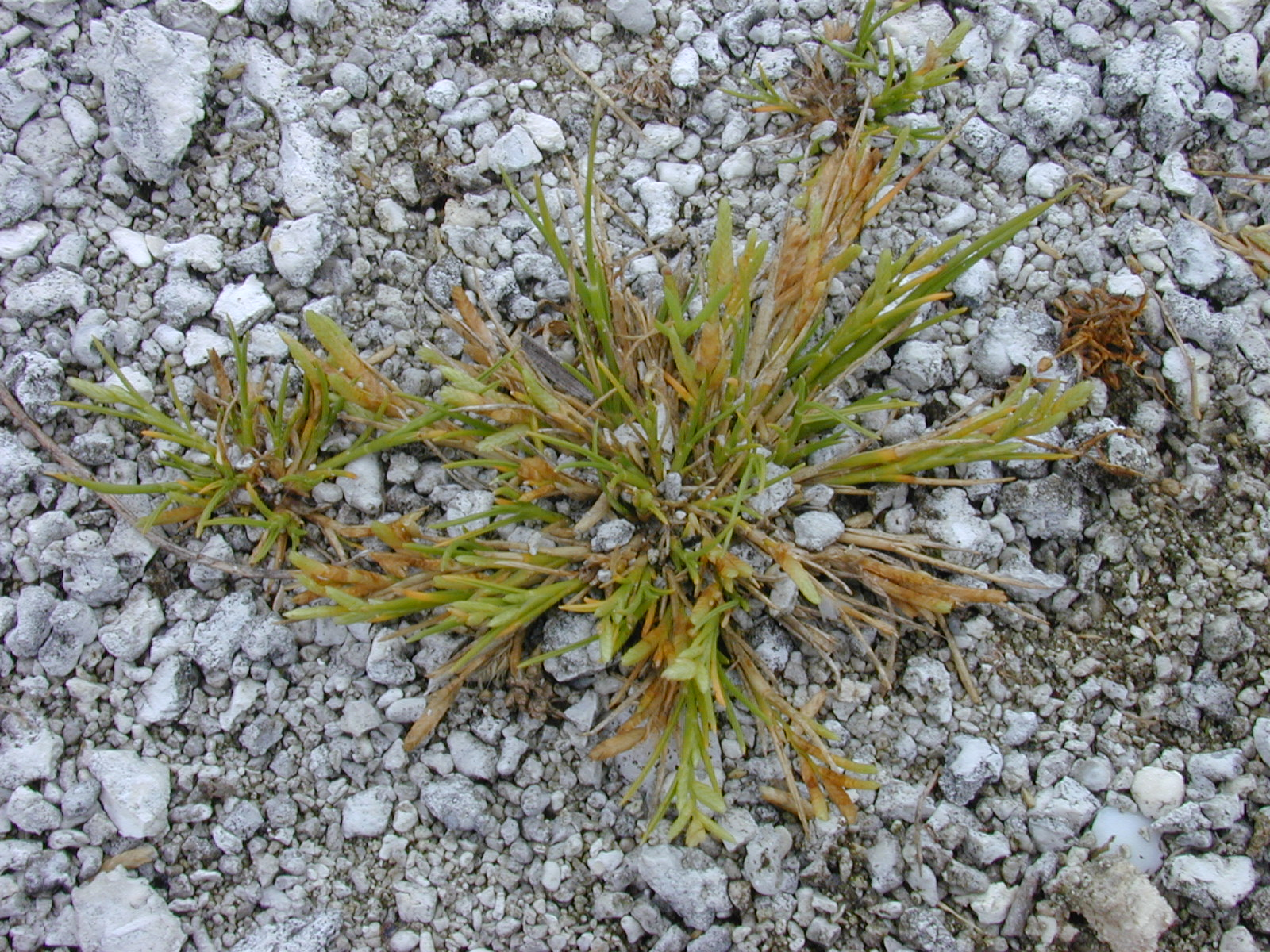

Scientific classification
- Kingdom: Plantae
- Clade: Tracheophytes
- Clade: Angiosperms
- Clade: Monocots
- Clade: Commelinids
- Order: Poales
- Family: Poaceae
- Subfamily: Chloridoideae
- Genus: Eragrostis
- Species: E. paupera

Binomial name
- Eragrostis paupera Jedwabn.

= Eragrostis paupera =

Species of flowering plant

Eragrostis paupera, known commonly as Dwarf Bunchgrass, Dwarf Lovegrass, Dwarf Eragrostris or Oahu Lovegrass, is a species of flowering plant in the family Poaceae. It is a perennial grass found in coastal areas of the Pacific Ocean islands of Kiribati and the United States, including the Gilbert Islands, the Phoenix Islands, the Line Islands and the Hawaiian Islands.

== Taxonomy ==
The species was first described by Elizabeth Jedwabnick in 1924. Eragrostis whitneyi, coined by Francis Raymond Fosberg in 1939, is a synonym of Eragrostis paupera.

== Description ==
Eragrostis paupera is a perennial grass. Its culms are tough, stiff and densely tufted, have a rough texture and grow straight, up to 20 cm (7.9 in) tall. The culms are almost entirely covered by smooth leaf sheaths that have bristly outgrowths at the juntion with the leaf blade, where a band of about 0.6 mm (0.024 in) long stiff bristles form a ligule. The leaf blades are bristly on top, rough on the bottom and can reach up to 5 cm (2.0 in) in length, but they are usually shorter.

The species' inflorescence is a raceme with panicles, and is sharply scabrous, with anywhere from a few to about 40 flat spikelets that are 5–45 mm (0.20–1.77 in) long and 1–2 mm (0.039–0.079 in) wide and comprise 5–35 fertile florets. The fruit is a flat, golden-brown caryopsis, 0.5–0.6 mm (0.020–0.024 in) long and 0.4–0.5 mm (0.016–0.020 in) wide, with a small brown tubercle sticking out at its base in the direction of the stem of the plant. In bloom, the plant is white, brown and green.

== Distribution and habitat ==
The species is found in the Pacific Ocean islands of Kiribati and the United States, including the Gilbert Islands, Line Islands, Phoenix Islands and the Hawaiian Islands, where in can be found in coastal areas at elevations of under 50 m (160 ft), growing in gravel, coral sand and saline flats.
