= Eragrostis peruviana =

Scientific classification
- Kingdom: Plantae
- Clade: Tracheophytes
- Clade: Angiosperms
- Clade: Monocots
- Clade: Commelinids
- Order: Poales
- Family: Poaceae
- Subfamily: Chloridoideae
- Genus: Eragrostis
- Species: E. peruviana

Binomial name
- Eragrostis peruviana (Jacq.) Trin.

Species of plant

Eragrostis peruviana is a species of flowering plant in the family Poaceae, native to Peru to northern Chile, including the Desventuradas Islands. It was first described by Nikolaus Joseph von Jacquin in 1787 as Poa peruviana, and transferred to Eragrostis by Carl Bernhard von Trinius in 1830.
