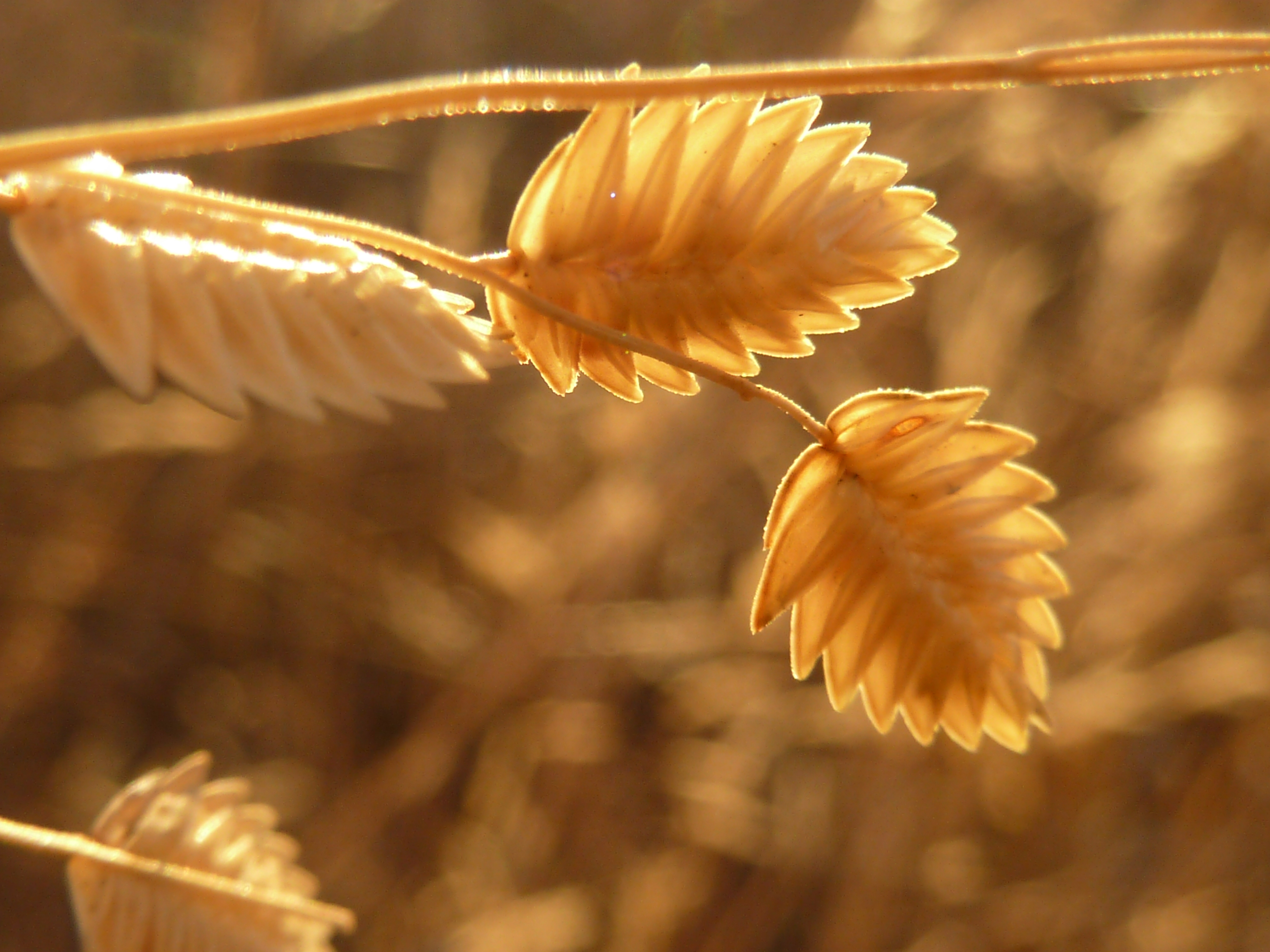
- Spikelets of Eragrostis superba

Scientific classification
- Kingdom: Plantae
- Clade: Tracheophytes
- Clade: Angiosperms
- Clade: Monocots
- Clade: Commelinids
- Order: Poales
- Family: Poaceae
- Subfamily: Chloridoideae
- Genus: Eragrostis
- Species: E. superba

Binomial name
- Eragrostis superba Peyr.

= Eragrostis superba =

Species of grass

Eragrostis superba is a species of perennial tufted grass in the family Poaceae. It is a palatable forage species but occurs at low densities.

It occurs from Sudan to South Africa, and flowers during the rainy season. The large, flat and oval-shaped spikelets are carried in long panicles. They have serrated edges and a purple or pinkish hue when fresh. It is native to sandy soils in open woodlands or sparse grassland, up to about 1,500 m in altitude, or occurs as a pioneer in disturbed areas.
