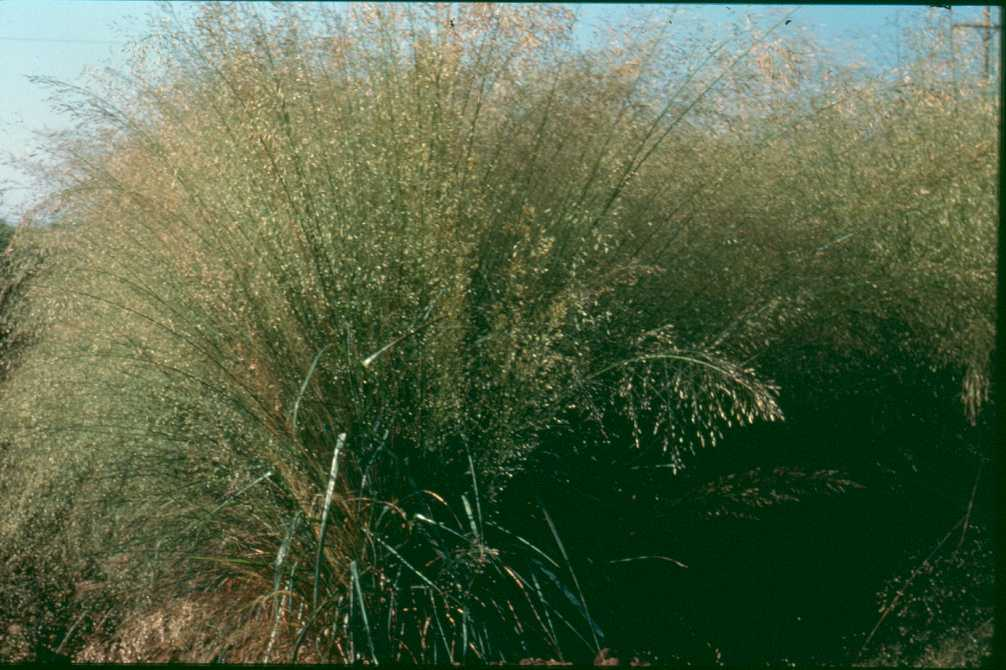

Scientific classification
- Kingdom: Plantae
- Clade: Tracheophytes
- Clade: Angiosperms
- Clade: Monocots
- Clade: Commelinids
- Order: Poales
- Family: Poaceae
- Subfamily: Chloridoideae
- Genus: Eragrostis
- Species: E. trichodes

Binomial name
- Eragrostis trichodes Wood

= Eragrostis trichodes =

Sand lovegrass

Species of flowering plant

Eragrostis trichodes, the sand lovegrass, is a warm season perennial bunchgrass native to North America.

== Description ==
Eragrostis trichodes is most common in sandy soil of the prairies on the central and southern Great Plains.

The diffuse seedhead is often half the size of the entire Sand lovegrass plant.
