= Eragrostis fosbergii =

Conservation status
- Critically Imperiled (NatureServe)

Scientific classification
- Kingdom: Plantae
- Clade: Tracheophytes
- Clade: Angiosperms
- Clade: Monocots
- Clade: Commelinids
- Order: Poales
- Family: Poaceae
- Subfamily: Chloridoideae
- Genus: Eragrostis
- Species: E. fosbergii

Binomial name
- Eragrostis fosbergii Whitney

Species of grass

Eragrostis fosbergii is a rare species of grass known by the common name Fosberg's love grass. It is endemic to Hawaii, where it is known only from the Waiʻanae Range on the island of Oahu. It was federally listed as an endangered species in 1996.

This grass was first collected in 1933 by Francis Raymond Fosberg, and in 1937 it was described as a new species and named for him. It was believed to be extinct until its rediscovery in 1991. At the time of its federal listing there were six individuals known on one mountain slope within the city limits of Honolulu. It is threatened by the degradation of its habitat by feral pigs, exotic species, and trampling.

This is a perennial grass growing up to a meter tall and producing a panicle of flowers up to 40 centimeters long.
