= Eragrostis refracta =

Scientific classification
- Kingdom: Plantae
- Clade: Tracheophytes
- Clade: Angiosperms
- Clade: Monocots
- Clade: Commelinids
- Order: Poales
- Family: Poaceae
- Subfamily: Chloridoideae
- Genus: Eragrostis
- Species: E. refracta

Binomial name
- Eragrostis refracta (Muhl.) Scribn.

Species of plant

Eragrostis refracta, commonly known as coastal lovegrass, is a perennial graminoid in the family Poaceae that is found in the southeastern United States.

== Description ==
Eragrostis refracta is a tufted perennial grass arising from a hardened base, with culms 30–100 cm tall and both nodes and internodes glabrous. Leaves are primarily low on the stem, with elongated blades up to 25 cm long and 1.5–4 mm wide, pilose on the upper surface, glabrous beneath, and scaberulous along the margins. Sheaths are glabrous, and ligules are short (0.1–0.2 mm), membranous, with long trichomes at the throat. The panicle is loose and open, occupying half to three-quarters of the plant's height, and is half as wide to nearly as wide as long. Branches are flexuous and scaberulous. Spikelets are appressed, with dark margins and light centers, 4–22-flowered, 8–13 mm long, and 1.5–1.8 mm wide; lateral spikelets are longer than their pedicels. Glumes are 1-nerved, scabrous along the keel, acuminate; the first glume is 0.8–1.3 mm long, and the second is 1.5–2 mm long. Lemmas are 3-nerved, scabrous-keeled, acuminate, and 1.5–1.8 mm long. Paleas are persistent, 1–1.5 mm long, and ciliate. Grains are reddish, oblong, and 0.5–0.7 mm long.

== Distribution and habitat ==
Coastal lovegrass is found from Delaware south to southern Florida and west to Texas. It grows in pine savannas, woodlands, pinelands, marshes, bogs and seeps, and maritime grasslands.

== Ecology ==
Coastal lovegrass is a "fire follower," meaning that it is found in areas that are burned and the years since fire disturbance does not affect its frequency significantly.

It has good foraging value, providing food for cattle in early spring and tending to increase in abundance under grazing.

Coastal lovegrass pollinate by hydrophily. Its pollen is dispersed by waterflow in streams and rivers.
