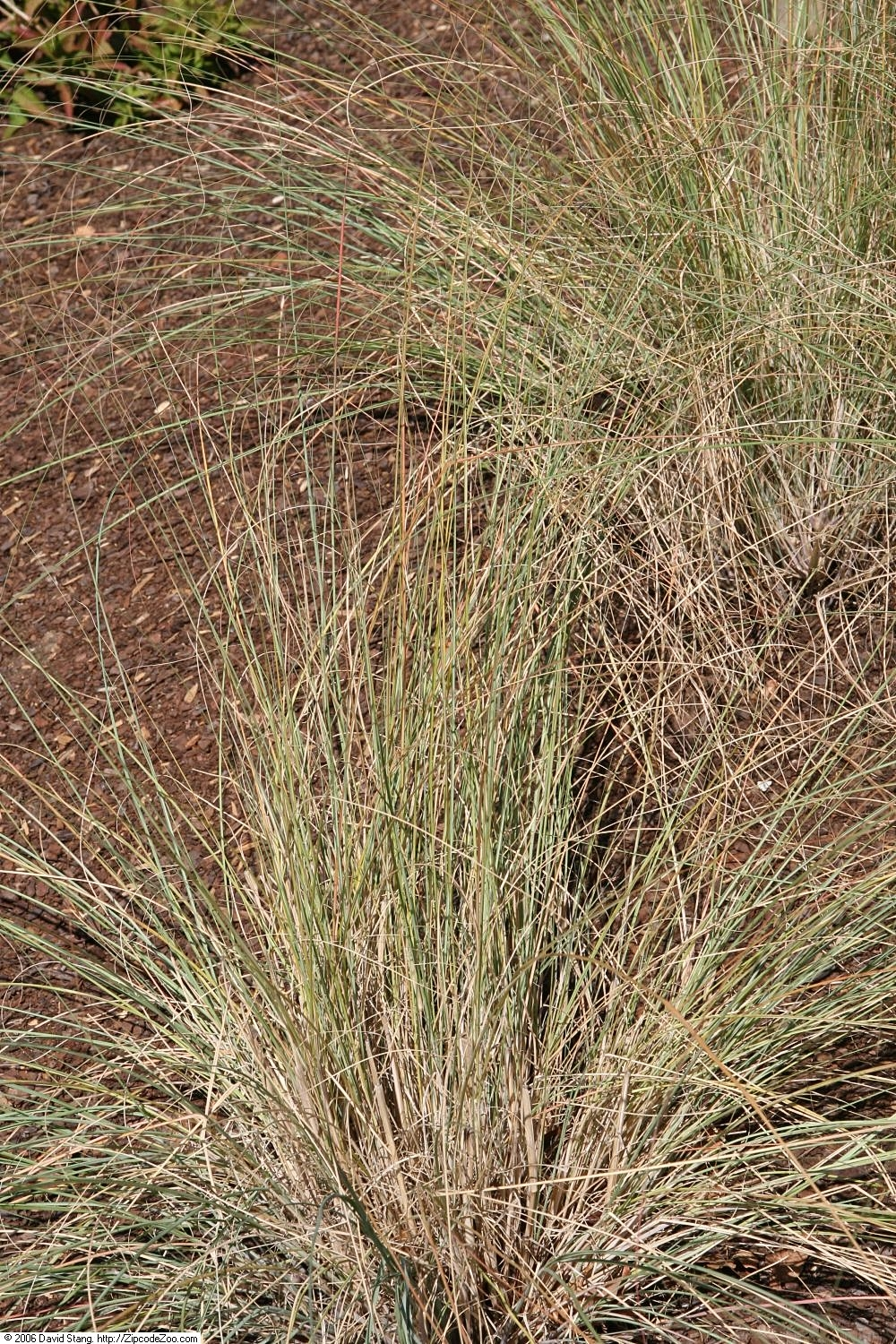

Scientific classification
- Kingdom: Plantae
- Clade: Tracheophytes
- Clade: Angiosperms
- Clade: Monocots
- Clade: Commelinids
- Order: Poales
- Family: Poaceae
- Subfamily: Chloridoideae
- Genus: Eragrostis
- Species: E. elliottii

Binomial name
- Eragrostis elliottii S. Watson

= Eragrostis elliottii =

Species of plant

Eragrostis elliottii, commonly known as Elliott's lovegrass, is a perennial graminoid in the family Poaceae. In the United States, it is found from North Carolina to southern Florida, west to eastern Texas. It is also found in the West Indies and in central Mexico south to Belize. It grows in maritime wet grasslands, inland edges of brackish marshes and freshwater tidal marshes, ultisol wet pine savannas, and calcareously-influenced wet pine savannas.
