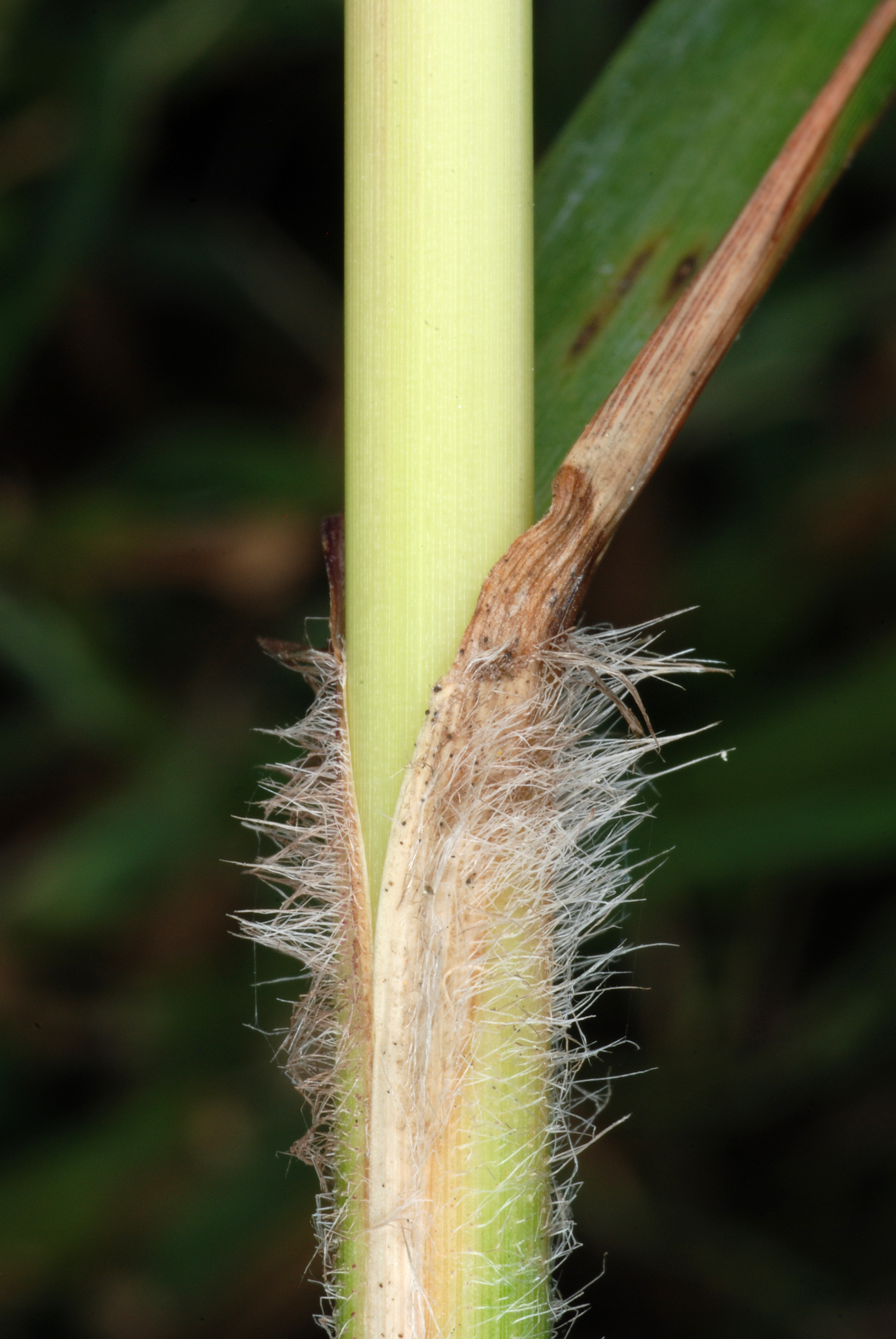

Scientific classification
- Kingdom: Plantae
- Clade: Tracheophytes
- Clade: Angiosperms
- Clade: Monocots
- Clade: Commelinids
- Order: Poales
- Family: Poaceae
- Subfamily: Chloridoideae
- Genus: Eragrostis
- Species: E. hirsuta

Binomial name
- Eragrostis hirsuta (Michx.) Nees.

= Eragrostis hirsuta =

Species of plant

Eragrostis hirsuta, commonly known as bigtop lovegrass, is a perennial graminoid of the Poaceae family native to North America. It generally flowers from July to December.

== Description ==
Bigtop lovegrass lacks rhizomes and glandular structures, with erect, smooth culms reaching 30 to 100 cm tall. Leaf sheaths are usually hairy, especially near the apex and margins, while the flat to loosely rolled blades are mostly hairless. The ligules are very short (0.2–0.4 mm). The plant produces a large, open, ovate panicle (25–85 cm long) with slender, widely spreading branches. Spikelets are 2 to 5 mm long, greenish with purplish tinges, and contain 2 to 6 florets that disarticulate from the top down. Glumes and lemmas are thin and lance-shaped; paleas are translucent with acute to obtuse tips. Each floret has three small purplish anthers. The fruit is a small, reddish-brown, slightly compressed grain.

== Distribution and habitat ==
In the United States, bigtop lovegrass is found from Maryland south to Florida, west to Texas, and north in the interior to Tennessee, Arkansas, and Missouri. It is also found in Central America. It grows in fields, clearings, roadsides, and disturbed areas.
