= Eragrostis aquatica =

Scientific classification
- Kingdom: Plantae
- Clade: Tracheophytes
- Clade: Angiosperms
- Clade: Monocots
- Clade: Commelinids
- Order: Poales
- Family: Poaceae
- Subfamily: Chloridoideae
- Genus: Eragrostis
- Species: E. aquatica

Binomial name
- Eragrostis aquatica Honda

Species of grass

Eragrostis aquatica is a species of grass (family Poaceae), native to west Honshu island, Japan. It grows on the edges of wet areas, and has also been recorded from South Korea.
