= Eragrostis desertorum =

Scientific classification
- Kingdom: Plantae
- Clade: Tracheophytes
- Clade: Angiosperms
- Clade: Monocots
- Clade: Commelinids
- Order: Poales
- Family: Poaceae
- Subfamily: Chloridoideae
- Genus: Eragrostis
- Species: E. desertorum

Binomial name
- Eragrostis desertorum Domin

Species of grass

Eragrostis desertorum is a species of grass known from Queensland, Western Australia, and the Northern Territory. It occurs in seasonally wet habitats such as gulleys, valleys and creek fans.

Eragrostis desertorum is a perennial herb spreading by means of stolons. It can reach a height of 60 cm. Leaves are stiff, filiform, mostly basal, up to 12 cm long, with ciliate sheaths. Inflorescence is paniculate, up to 18 cm long. It is similar to E. eriopoda but with 2 stamens.
