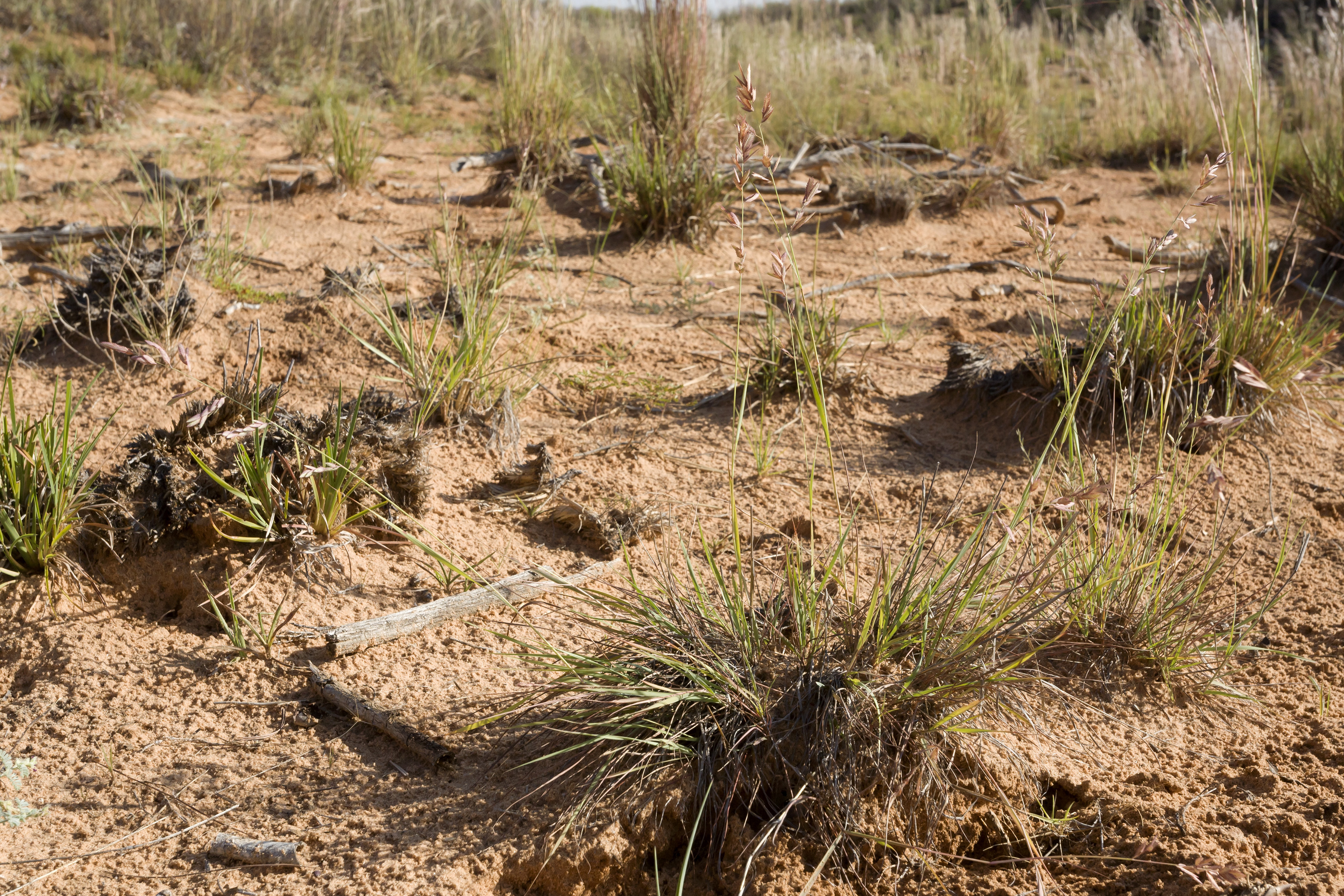
- In New Mexico
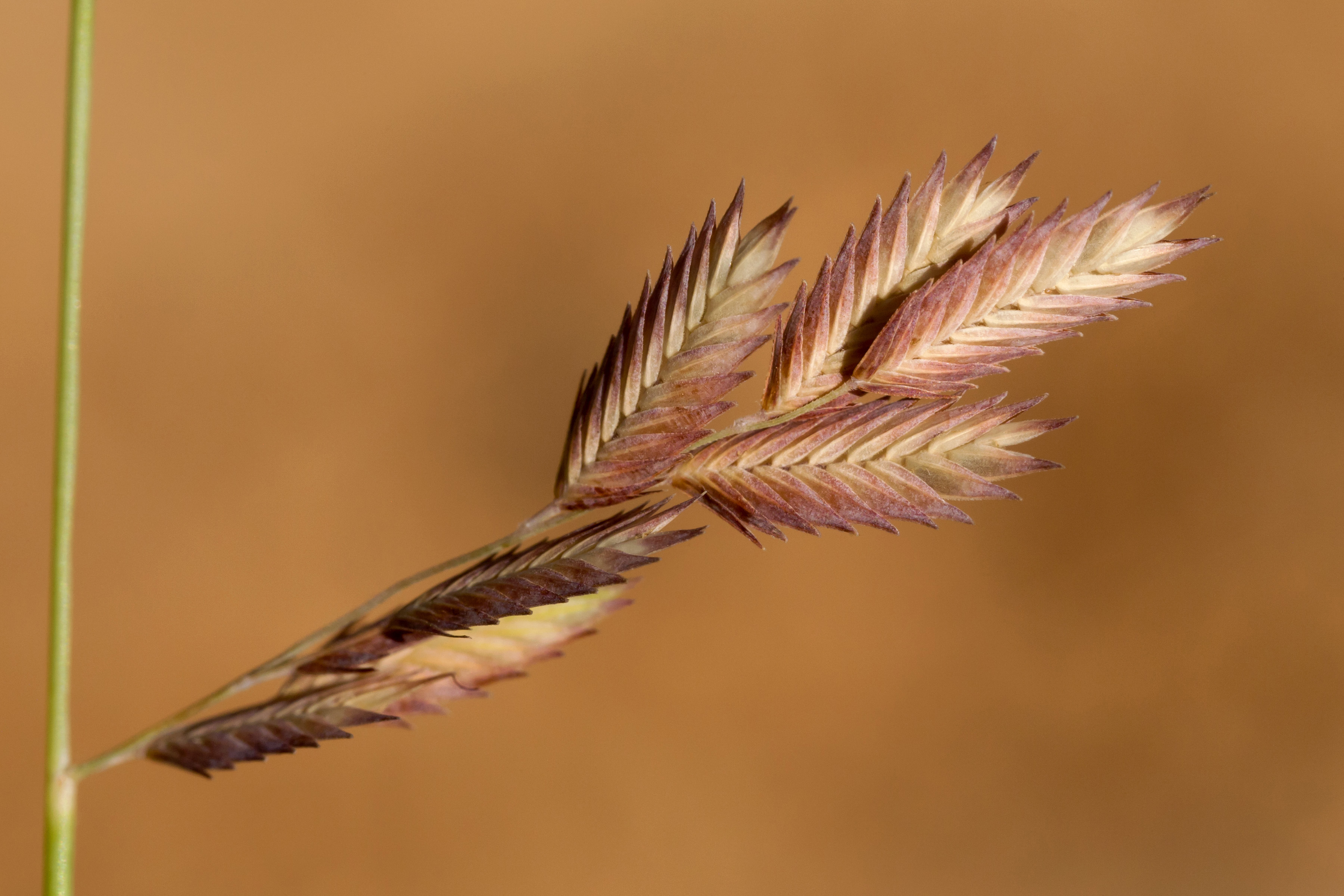
- The redness is typical, but is not a reliable indicator

Scientific classification
- Kingdom: Plantae
- Clade: Tracheophytes
- Clade: Angiosperms
- Clade: Monocots
- Clade: Commelinids
- Order: Poales
- Family: Poaceae
- Subfamily: Chloridoideae
- Genus: Eragrostis
- Species: E. secundiflora

Binomial name
- Eragrostis secundiflora J.Presl

Synonyms
- List: Eragrostis beyrichii J.G.Sm.; Eragrostis compacta Steud.; Eragrostis interrupta Trel., Branner & Coville; Eragrostis oxylepis (Torr.) Torr.; Eragrostis oxylepis var. beyrichii (J.G.Sm.) Shinners; Eragrostis secundiflora var. capitata (E.Fourn.) Beetle; Eragrostis secundiflora subsp. oxylepis (Torr.) S.D.Koch; Eragrostis squarrosa E.Fourn.; Eragrostis vahlii var. sejuncta Döll; Eragrostis vahlii var. subfasciculata Döll; Eragrostis verae-crucis Rupr. ex Galeotti; Eragrostis yucatana L.H.Harv.; Megastachya oxylepis (Torr.) E.Fourn.; Megastachya oxylepis var. capitata E.Fourn.; Poa compacta Salzm. ex Steud.; Poa interrupta Nutt.; Poa oxylepis Torr.; Poa secundiflora (J.Presl) Kunth

= Eragrostis secundiflora =

Species of plant

Eragrostis secundiflora (syn. Eragrostis oxylepis), red lovegrass, is a species of flowering plant in the family Poaceae, native to the central and southern United States, Mexico, and northern South America. A perennial reaching at most 70 cm (28 in), it is found in prairies and open woodlands, typically in sandy soils. Its seeds are considerably larger than other species of Eragrostis.
