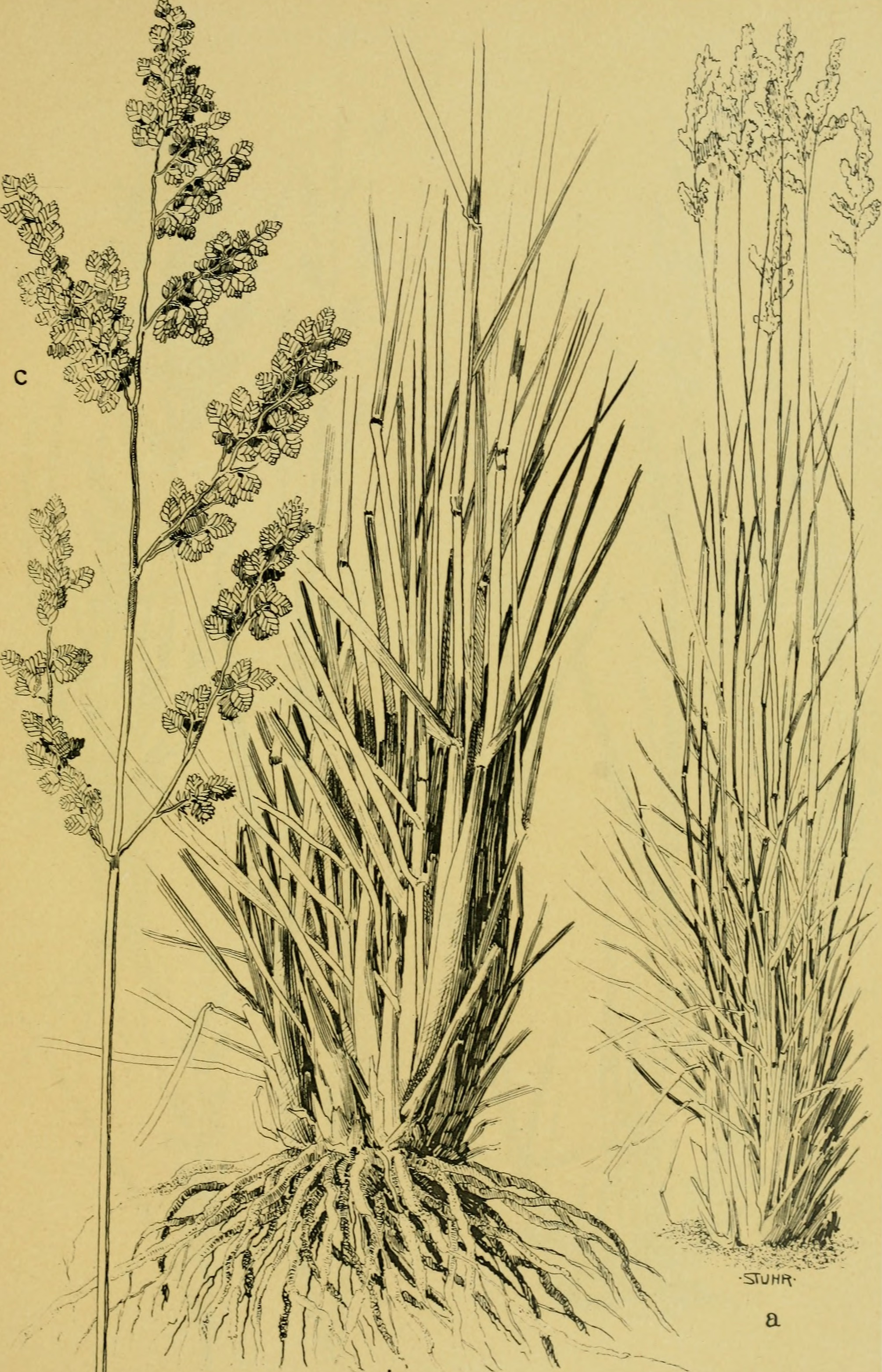

Scientific classification
- Kingdom: Plantae
- Clade: Embryophytes
- Clade: Tracheophytes
- Clade: Spermatophytes
- Clade: Angiosperms
- Clade: Monocots
- Clade: Commelinids
- Order: Poales
- Family: Poaceae
- Subfamily: Chloridoideae
- Genus: Eragrostis
- Species: E. echinochloidea

Binomial name
- Eragrostis echinochloidea Stapf

= Eragrostis echinochloidea =

African lovegrass

Species of plant

Eragrostis echinochloidea, (English: African lovegrass; Afrikaans: Krummelgras, "crumb grass") is a species of grass native to South Africa (Limpopo. North West, and Northern Cape provinces). Listed as "safe" (LC) on the SANBI Red List, the plant can also be found in Zimbabwe, Botswana, and Namibia.

African lovegrass is a perennial tussock that grows straight and knee-high. The leaves have tapered, papery sheaths and seed clusters sunken under the edges. The flower is a scarcely branched plume with closely packed spines on single branches. The spines are edible by humans and baboons. The drought tolerant species grows on disturbed veld and stony hillsides.

In Deception Valley, one of the three dry riverbeds of the Central Kalahari Game Reserve in Botswana, the species prospers along with Enneapogon desvauxii and Sporoborus iocladus in the rainy season (from November to April/May).
