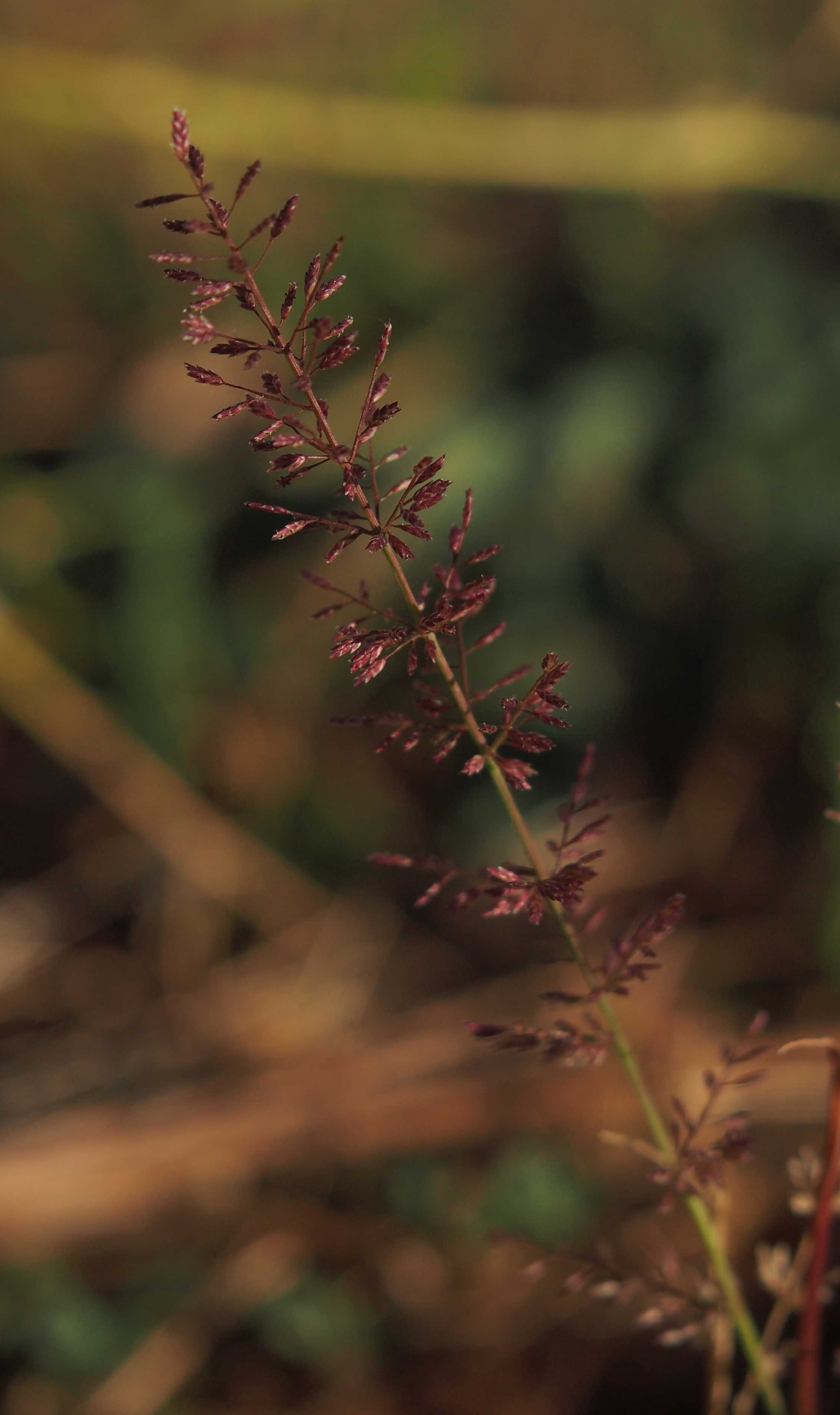
- Closeup of flowerhead
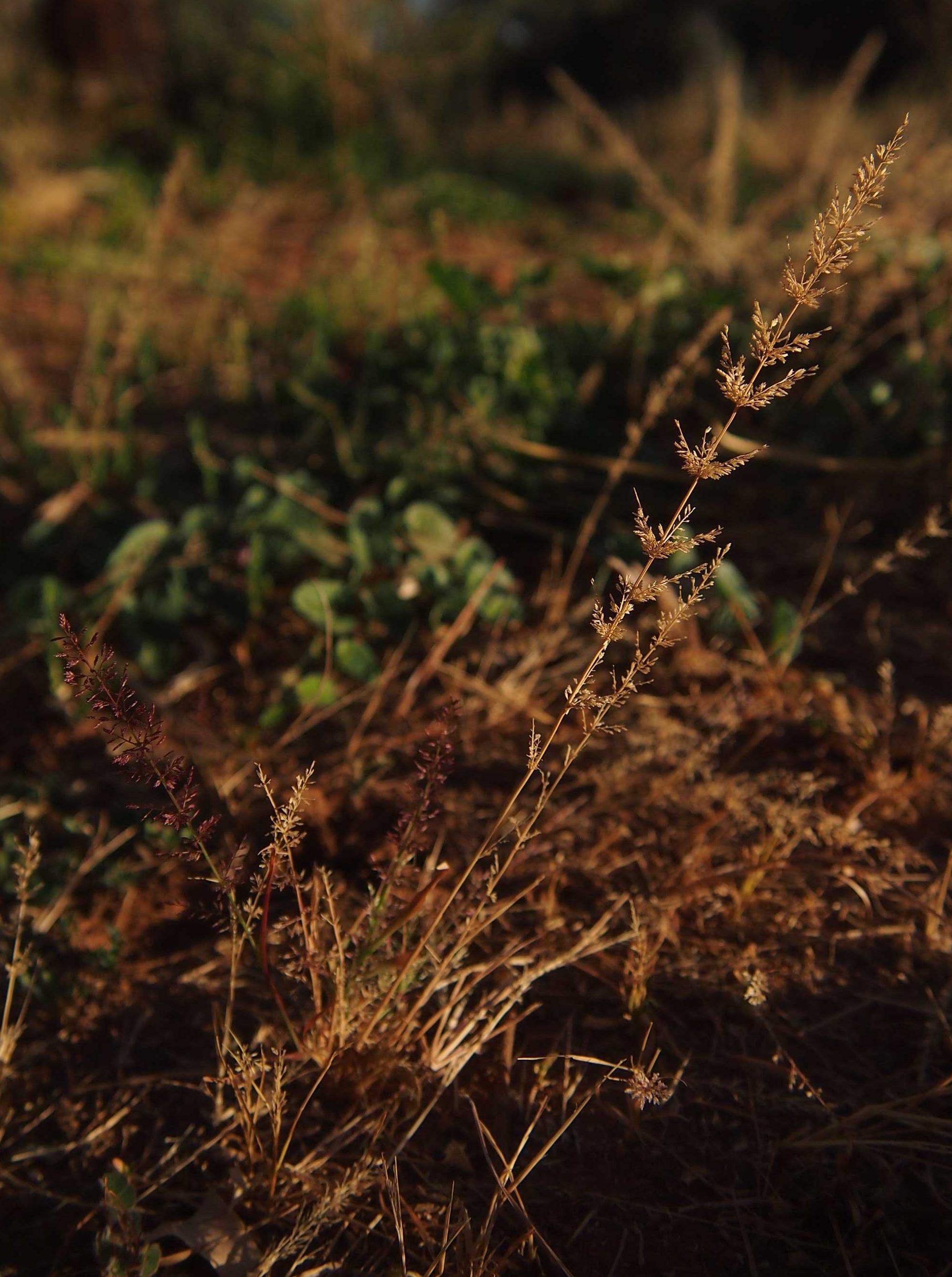
- Gone to seed

Scientific classification
- Kingdom: Plantae
- Clade: Embryophytes
- Clade: Tracheophytes
- Clade: Angiosperms
- Clade: Monocots
- Clade: Commelinids
- Order: Poales
- Family: Poaceae
- Subfamily: Chloridoideae
- Genus: Eragrostis
- Species: E. tenellula

Binomial name
- Eragrostis tenellula (Kunth) Steud.

Synonyms
- Eragrostis interrupta f. simplicior Domin; Eragrostis interrupta var. subsinguliflora Domin; Poa tenella R.Br.; Poa tenellula Kunth; Sporobolus lindleyi (Steud.) Benth.; Sporobolus pallidus Lindl.; Vilfa lindleyi Steud.

= Eragrostis tenellula =

Species of plant

Eragrostis tenellula, the delicate lovegrass, is a species of flowering plant in the family Poaceae. It is native to Australia, except Tasmania. A clump-forming annual reaching 6 to 50 cm (2 to 20 in), it is found in deserts and dry scrublands in a variety of soil types.
