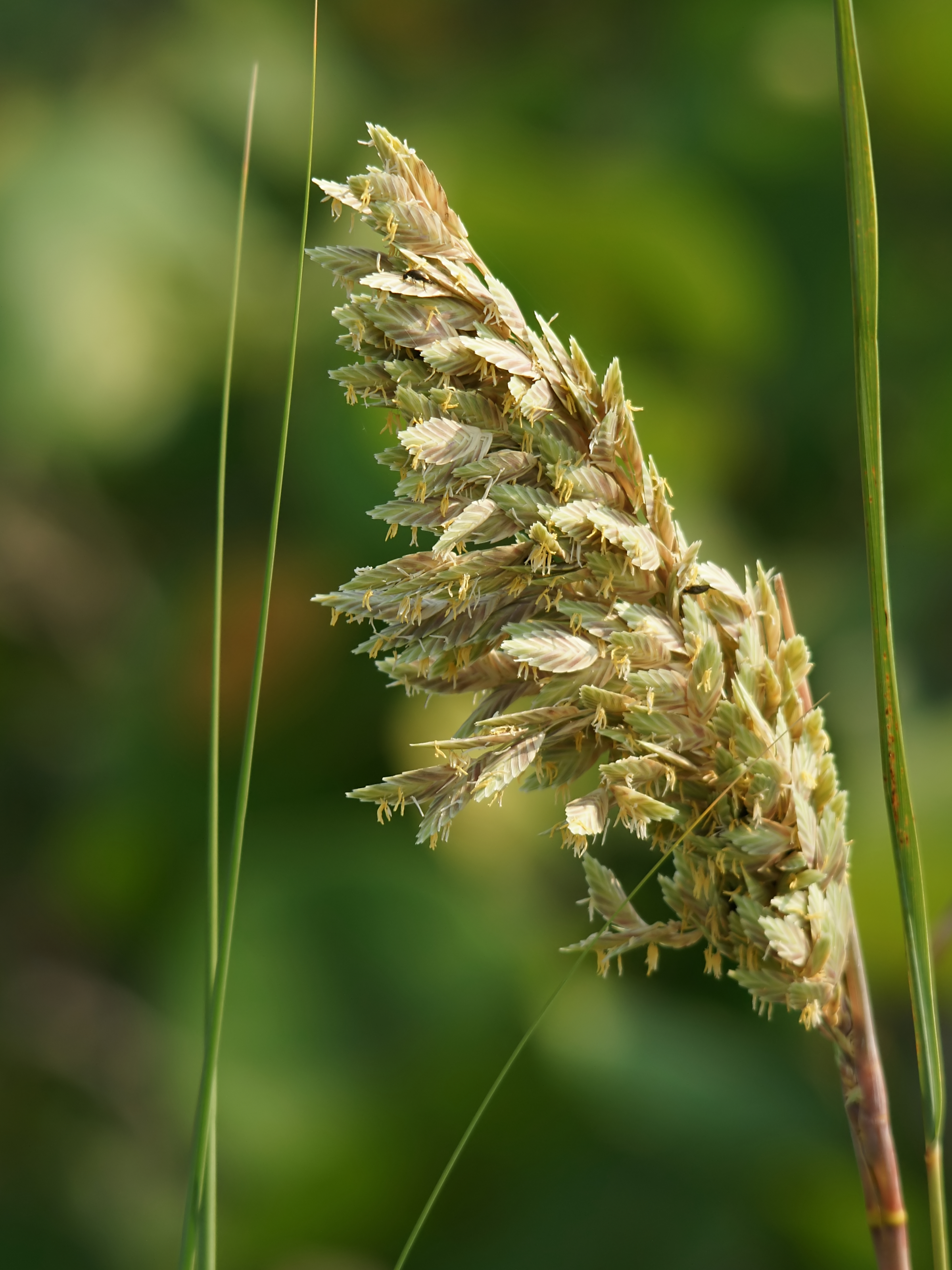
- Uniola paniculata Sanibel Island, Florida, United States

Scientific classification
- Kingdom: Plantae
- Clade: Tracheophytes
- Clade: Angiosperms
- Clade: Monocots
- Clade: Commelinids
- Order: Poales
- Family: Poaceae
- Subfamily: Chloridoideae
- Tribe: Eragrostideae
- Subtribe: Unioliinae
- Genus: Uniola; L.

Type species
- Uniola paniculata L.

Synonyms
- Leptochloopsis H.O.Yates; Leptochloöpsis H.O.Yates, alternate spelling; Nevroctola Raf.; Trisiola Raf.; Triunila Raf., name not validly published because proposed as provisional name

= Uniola =

Sea oats

Genus of grasses

Uniola is a genus of New World plants in the grass family.

Species

- Uniola condensata Hitchc. - Ecuador
- Uniola paniculata L. – sea oats - coastal regions in southeastern United States (TX LA MS AL GA FL NC SC VA DE), Mexico (Tamaulipas, Veracruz, Tabasco, Yucatán Peninsula); Nicaragua, Panama, Bahamas, Turks & Caicos, Cuba, Hispaniola
- Uniola peruviana Lægaard & Sánchez Vega - Peru
- Uniola pittieri Hack. - Mexico, Central America, Venezuela, Colombia, Peru, Ecuador incl Galápagos
- Uniola virgata (Poir.) Griseb. - West Indies incl. Bahamas

Formerly included

- Centotheca lappacea - Uniola lappacea
- Chasmanthium latifolium (Michx.) H.O.Yates (as U. latifolia Michx.)
- Chasmanthium laxum as Uniola laxa, Uniola longifolia
- Chasmanthium sessiliflorum (Poir.) H.O.Yates (as U. sessiliflora Poir.)
- Desmostachya bipinnata (L.) Stapf (as U. bipinnata L.)
- Distichlis palmeri (Vasey) Fassett ex I.M.Johnst. (as U. palmeri Vasey)
- Distichlis spicata var. spicata (as U. spicata L.)
- Distichlis spicata var. stricta (Torr.) Scribn. (as U. stricta Torr.)
- Distichlis distichophylla as Uniola distichophylla
- Eragrostis superba as Uniola jardinii
- Festuca amplissima as Uniola effusa, Uniola muelleri
- Halopyrum mucronatum as Uniola mucronata
- Tribolium uniolae as Uniola capensis
