= Distichlis bajaensis =

Scientific classification
- Kingdom: Plantae
- Clade: Tracheophytes
- Clade: Angiosperms
- Clade: Monocots
- Clade: Commelinids
- Order: Poales
- Family: Poaceae
- Subfamily: Chloridoideae
- Genus: Distichlis
- Species: D. bajaensis

Binomial name
- Distichlis bajaensis H.L.Bell

Species of grass

Distichlis bajaensis is a rare species of grass known by the common name Baja grass.

== Distribution ==
Distichlis bajaensis is endemic to Baja California, Mexico, where it is known from only one location in a salt marsh just outside Rosarito. The habitat is an arroyo with saline and alkaline soils which is grazed by goats and burros.

The grass grows alongside other halophytes including spiny rush (Juncus acutus), iodinebush (Allenrolfea occidentalis), and pickleweed (Salicornia sp.). Genetic and morphological analyses show that the plant is not any other Distichlis, nor a hybrid of the two most closely related Distichlis, and it was described to science as a new species in 2010.

== Description ==
Distichlis bajaensis is a rhizomatous perennial grass growing in short clumps and spreading via stolons. The leaf blades are no more than 1.5 centimeters long and are slightly bent; this bend is a good characteristic for identifying this grass in the field. Like other Distichlis, Baja grass is dioecious, with male and female inflorescences; only the male inflorescence has been included in the official description because no good female specimens have been collected.
