= Biosaline agriculture =

Production of crops in salt-rich conditions

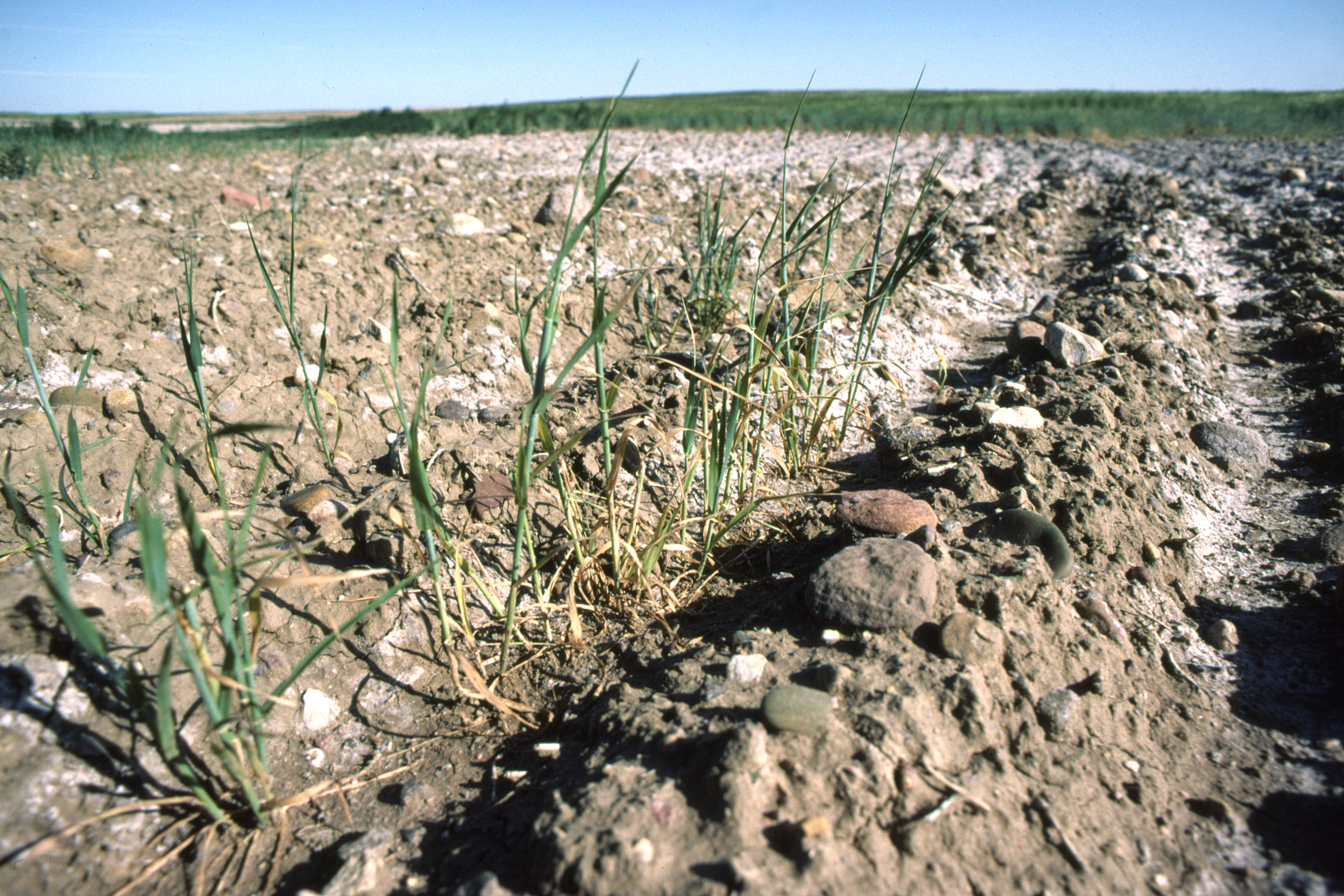
Halophyte plant growth in the saline-abundant soil of Liberty County, Montana, United States, July 1983.

Biosaline agriculture is the production and growth of plants in saline rich groundwater and/or soil. Biosaline agriculture is a broad concept that refers to sustainable agricultural practices using soil, groundwater, or both under varying levels of salinity. Biosaline agriculture is a practice using saline water and salt-tolerant plants, known as halophytes, to remediate unproductive arable land or transform naturally saline environments into productive farmland. By using high-salinity water for efficient irrigation, it helps to alleviate pressures on limited fresh water resources while also supporting forage production sites.

Soil salinization is a global issue with an estimated one billion hectares of salt-affected soil worldwide, in both coastal and continental areas, and another one million hectares being added to this each year. The hydrogeological conditions differ substantially depending on geographic region and, therefore, influence the application of biosaline agriculture. In many parts of the world, particularlyarid and semi-arid regions, coastal and inland areas typically have brackish and saline water sources. These arid and semi-arid regions most affected by salinity can be found in countries in Asia, Oceania, Europe, North America, and South America. The integration of biosaline solutions has become necessary in such areas where freshwater is often scarce and seawater is ample. Biosaline agriculture is a means of producing ecologically and economically viable crops under fresh-water scarcity and differing levels of soil salinity.

Salinity problems date back to Mesopotamian societies and biosaline solutions have been integrated in agriculture throughout history. The formalized practice of biosaline agriculture was not officially established until the late 1990s. Halophytes are the cornerstone of biosaline agriculture and serve a critical role in its many applications which include, but are not limited to, crop/forage production, desalination/restoration of high salinity environments, and uses medicinally and as biofuel.

== Applications of biosaline agriculture ==
=== Crops/forage ===
Several halophytic plant species are suitable for human consumption, some recognized as gourmet foods. Wild halophytes, specifically, may be richer in nutrients and bioactive compounds. Prominent edible halophytes include genera such as Salicornia, Sarcocornia, Atriplex, Crithmum, and Suaeda. These taxa are primarily found in saline environments—especially coastal salt marshes, but also inland saline habitats—and have a broad distribution ranging from the temperate to Arctic regions. Many are incorporated in diverse cuisines worldwide, with many species being particularly prevalent in traditional Mediterranean cuisine, where they can eaten in salads or pickled. Additional edible halophytes include, but are not limited to, sea beet, sea holly, caper plants, and spiny chicory, and certain salt-tolerant marsh grasses.

Some salt-tolerant plants can be used as forage or fodder for livestock, including legumes, grasses, shrubs, cereal crops, and forbs and particularly chenopods. These plants can then contribute to the production of dairy products, meat, wool, and various other livestock-derived products.

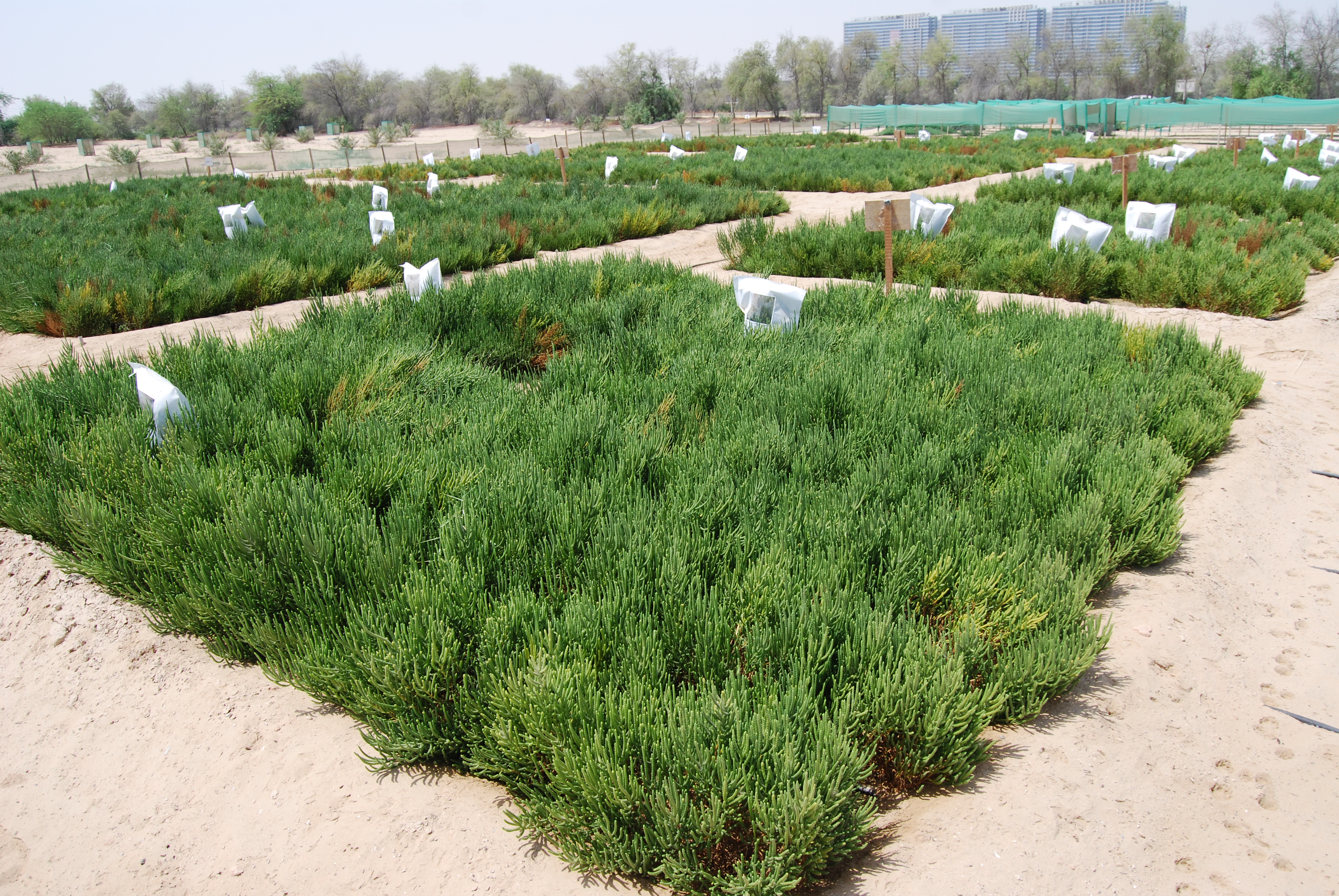
Salicornia research plots at International Center for Biosaline Agriculture on 23 July 2014

=== Desalination and restoration ===
Biosaline agriculture offers a sustainable alternative to conventional agricultural practices as it aids in ecosystem restoration. Halophytic plants are able to desalinate brackish water, accumulate heavy metals from soils and groundwater through bioaccumulation, while growing without freshwater reliance. Through consecutive growing cycles of halophytes, areas with degraded soil and water can be restored, making them more suitable for agricultural use.

Biodesalination refers to a range of approaches that use microbial electrochemical systems (MESs) as well as halophytic plant-based methods, such as haloengineering and haloculture, to remove salts from water. In recent years, it has become increasingly integrated with biosaline agriculture and has shown to be a promising approach to cost-effectively mitigate the effects of saline water, particularly in arid and semi-arid climates.

Haloengineering has also emerged as another sustainable approach for the rehabilitation and productive use of salt-affacted ecosystems. The application of haloculture practices allows for both the production and the management of fresh water and energy resources.

=== Medicines ===
Biosaline agriculture has been integrated into medicinal practices through the use of halophytes which exhibit biochemical, morphological, and physiological adaptions to varying salinity levels. Halophytes have been applied to both pharmaceutical and traditional herbal medicine systems. These plants are rich in bioactive compounds, including polyunsaturated fatty acids, vitamin, and oils, as well as bioactive phytochemicals such as flavonoids, tannins, and saponins, and they demonstrate a significant antioxidant capacity (AC). Together, these bioactive constituents and the plants' high AC contribute to health-promoting benefits effects, including anti-inflammatory, anti-tumor, and anticancer properties, as well as prevention of various diseases.

Certain halophytes, including species of the genus Salicornia, have shown efficacy in promoting wound healing and providing preventive and protective benefits for the skin. These benefits can be delivered through topical application either directly or via patches or bandages, and may additionally provide anti-aging effects.

=== Biofuel ===
Ongoing research is exploring the potential of halophytes for biofuel production within biosaline agriculture, as seed oils from these plants are already a proven source for biodiesel. Halophytes can be efficiently and sustainably converted into biofuels by using both the oil extracted from their seeds and their lignocellulosic biomass.

== History ==
Salinity and human civilizations have been closely associated for thousands of years. Widespread soil salinization led to the decline of Mesopotamian civilizations due to poor irrigation practices, mirroring agricultural water issues currently facing farmers. The first of these salinity events can be traced back from 2400 BC to 1700 BC. Halophytes, specifically, can be traced back to Theophrastus and his early records observing the plants, but it wasn't until the 18th century that they gained more importance chemically. The historical use of salt-tolerant plants to has evolved into a recognized scientific field—biosaline agriculture. The scientific field of biosaline agriculture gained recognition in the mid-to-late 1990s with the establishment of the International Center for Biosaline Agriculture (IBCA) in 1996; the center became fully operational in 1999. The Government of the United Arab Emirates and Islamic Development Bank (IsDB) formed a partnership to address global salinity issues, water scarcity, and sustainable crop cultivation in arid and salt-affected regions.

== Halophytes ==
Salt-tolerant plants that flourish in high-salinity conditions are called halophytes. Halophytes are a vital component in biosaline agriculture as they specialize and thrive high-salinity environments where traditional crops fail. The implementation of halophytes has the potential to restore salt-rich environments, provide for global food demands, produce medicine and biofuels, and conserve fresh water.

== Climate change and food security ==
As the world's population continues to increase, the salinization of soil poses a larger threat to food security. Salinity currently affects one quarter of global arable land, and is projected to double by 2050. Biosaline agriculture provides new strategies for water management, especially saline water, as well as improvements in salt tolerance which could be pivotal to food system resilience. Climate change has caused, and will continue to cause, an increase in temperature and a decrease in rainfall worsening water scarcity and food production in vulnerable areas such as the Middle East and North Africa. Biosaline agriculture can help expand irrigated areas and improve irrigation efficiency through the use of alternative water sources, such as brackish or saline water, while maximizing the efficiency of existing resources. These processes are crucial to increasing food production, specifically in susceptible regions.

== See also ==
- Alkali soil – Soil type with pH > 8.5
- Arabidopsis thaliana responses to salinity
- Crop tolerance to seawater – Quality in crops
- Environmental impacts of deicing salt – Chemicals used to de-ice surfaces
- Salt tolerance of crops
- Soil salinity – Salt content in the soil
