= Biosalinity =

Use of salty water for irrigation

Biosalinity is the study and practice of using saline (salty) water for irrigating agricultural crops.

Many arid and semi-arid areas actually do have sources of water, but the available water is usually brackish (0.5–5g/L salt) or saline (30–50g/L salt). The water may be present in underground aquifers or as seawater along coastal deserts. With traditional farming practices, saline water results in soil salinization, rendering it unfit for raising most crop plants. Indeed, many arid and semi-arid areas were simply considered unsuitable for agriculture, and agricultural development of these areas was not systematically attempted until the second half of the 20th century.

Research in biosalinity includes studies of the biochemical and physiological mechanisms of salt tolerance in plants, breeding and selection for salt tolerance (halotolerance), discovery of periods in a crop plant's life cycle when it may be less sensitive to salt, use of saline irrigation water to increase desirable traits (such as sugar concentration in a fruit) or to control the ripening process, study of the interaction between salinity and soil properties, and development of naturally salt-tolerant plant species (halophytes) into useful agricultural crops. See also halophile bacteria, which thrive under conditions of high salinity.

When properly applied (watering well in excess of evapotranspiration, maintaining soil structure for excellent drainage), brackish-water irrigation does not result in increased salinization of the soil. Sometimes this means that farmers have to add extra water after a rainstorm, to carry salts back down to below the root zone.

== See also ==
- Alkali soil – Soil type with pH > 8.5
- Arid Forest Research Institute (AFRI) – Indian forest research institute
- Biosaline agriculture – Production of crops in salt-rich conditions
- Crop tolerance to seawater – Crop tolerance to seawater is the ability of an agricultural crop to withstand the high salinity induced by irrigation with seawater.
- Halophyte – Salt-tolerant plant
- Halotolerance – Adaptation to high salinity
- Salt tolerance of crops
- Sodium in biology – Use of sodium by organisms
- Soil salinity – Salt content in the soil
- Soil salinity control – Controlling the problem of soil salinity
