= U.S. Salinity Laboratory =

National Laboratory for research on salt-affected soil

Coordinates: 33.975487°N 117.317774°W

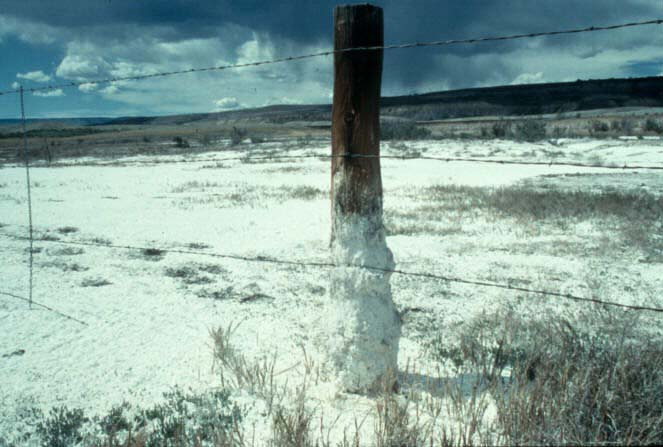
Salt-affected soils on rangeland in Colorado.

The U.S. Salinity Laboratory is a National Laboratory for research on salt-affected soil-plant-water systems. It resorts under the Agricultural Research Service (ARS) of the United States Department of Agriculture (USDA) and is located in Riverside, California, U.S.A.

The mission of its staff is to develop, amongst other, new knowledge and technology for crop production on salt-affected lands.

== History ==
The Lab started its operations in 1947 at Riverside.

In 1954 one of the first all encompassing publications, the USDA Agriculture Handbook No. 60, has seen the light

== Research focus ==
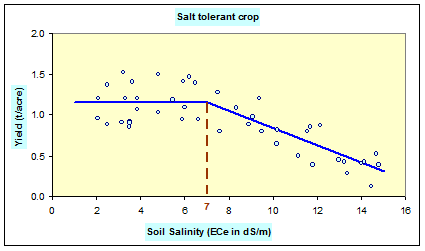
Maas–Hoffman model fitted to data (blue lines). The model for salt tolerance of crops stems from Riverside.

Saline and alkali soil conditions reduce the value and productivity of considerable areas of land in the United States. The problem is an old one, and there is much information on this subject in the technical literature. Many crop failures result from growing crops that have low salt tolerance. Alfalfa, barley, sugar beets, and cotton are tolerant crops that can often be grown where salinity is a problem.

== Data bases ==
The Salinity Laboratory keeps data bases of salt tolerance of crops divided into 5 groups: 1) Fiber, Grain and Special Crops, 2) Grasses and Forage Crops, 3) Vegetables and Fruit Crops, 4) Woody Crops, 5) Ornamental Shrubs, Trees and Ground Cover.

== Salinity models ==
Software for quite a number of soil salinity models covering different aspects was developed at Riverside, including the Hydrus model and the Van Genuchten–Gupta model.
