= Streptomyces smyrnaeus =

Scientific classification
- Domain: Bacteria
- Kingdom: Bacillati
- Phylum: Actinomycetota
- Class: Actinomycetia
- Order: Streptomycetales
- Family: Streptomycetaceae
- Genus: Streptomyces
- Species: S. smyrnaeus

Binomial name
- Streptomyces smyrnaeus Tatar et al. 2014

Type strain
- DSM 42105, KCTC 29214, SM3501

Species of bacterium

Streptomyces smyrnaeus is a halotolerant bacterium species from the genus of Streptomyces which has been isolated from pond sediments from a salt lake in İzmir in Turkey.

== See also ==
- List of Streptomyces species
