= Streptomyces iconiensis =

Scientific classification
- Domain: Bacteria
- Kingdom: Bacillati
- Phylum: Actinomycetota
- Class: Actinomycetia
- Order: Streptomycetales
- Family: Streptomycetaceae
- Genus: Streptomyces
- Species: S. iconiensis

Binomial name
- Streptomyces iconiensis Tatar et al. 2014

Type strain
- BNT558, DSM 42109, KCTC 29198

Species of bacterium

Streptomyces iconiensis is a halotolerant bacterium species from the genus of Streptomyces which has been isolated from soil from a salt lake in Konya in Turkey.

== See also ==
- List of Streptomyces species
