= Streptomyces albiaxialis =

Scientific classification
- Domain: Bacteria
- Kingdom: Bacillati
- Phylum: Actinomycetota
- Class: Actinomycetia
- Order: Streptomycetales
- Family: Streptomycetaceae
- Genus: Streptomyces
- Species: S. albiaxialis

Binomial name
- Streptomyces albiaxialis Kuznetsov et al. 1993

Type strain
- AS 4.1876, BIO K-197, CGMCC 4.1876, DSM 41799, JCM 15478, NBRC 101002, NRRL B-24327, VKM A-691, VKM Ac-691, VTT E-73018

Species of bacterium

Streptomyces albiaxialis is a halotolerant bacterium species from the genus of Streptomyces which has been isolated from an oil field in Russia.

== See also ==
- List of Streptomyces species
