= Scythris falkovitshi =

Scientific classification
- Kingdom: Animalia
- Phylum: Arthropoda
- Clade: Pancrustacea
- Class: Insecta
- Order: Lepidoptera
- Family: Scythrididae
- Genus: Scythris
- Species: S. falkovitshi

Binomial name
- Scythris falkovitshi Nupponen, 2009

Species of moth

Scythris falkovitshi is a moth species of the family Scythrididae. It was described by Kari Nupponen in 2009. It is found in Uzbekistan. The habitat consists of edges of saline deserts with halophytic vegetation.
