= Crop tolerance to seawater =

Quality in crops

Crop tolerance to seawater is the ability of an agricultural crop to withstand the high salinity induced by irrigation with seawater, or a mixture of fresh water and seawater. There are crops that can grow on seawater and demonstration farms have shown the feasibility. The government of the Netherlands reports a breakthrough in food security as specific varieties of potatoes, carrots, red onions, white cabbage and broccoli appear to thrive if they are irrigated with salt water.

== Salt Farm Texel ==
The Salt Farm Texel, a farm on the island of Texel, The Netherlands, is testing the salt tolerance of crops under controlled field conditions. There are 56 experimental plots of 160 m^{2} each that are treated in eight replicas with seven different salt concentrations. These concentrations are obtained with intensive daily drip irrigations of 10 or more mm (i.e. more than 10 liter per m^{2} per day) with water having a salt concentration expressed in electric conductivity (EC) of 2, 4, 8, 12, 16, 20 and 35 dS/m. The range of EC values is obtained by mixing fresh water with the appropriate amount of seawater having a salinity corresponding to an EC value of about 50 dS/m. After planting, crops were allowed to germinate under fresh water conditions before the salt treatment started.

=== Soil salinity ===
The soil salinity is expressed in the electric conductivity of the extract of a saturated soil paste (ECe in dS/m).

Author Schleiff presented a classification of salt tolerance of crops based on ECe in dS/m that may be summarized as follows:

Salt tolerance ECe (dS/m) ^)	Tolerance classification
< 2	very sensitive
2 – 4	sensitive
4 – 6	slightly sensitive
6 – 8	moderately tolerant
8 – 10	tolerant
> 10	very tolerant

^) The crop performs well (no yield reduction) up to the soil salinity level listed in the table. Beyond that level, the yield goes down.

The main difference with the classification published by Richards in the USDA Agriculture Handbook No. 60, 1954 is that the classes are narrower with steps of 2 dS/m instead of 4.

=== Modeling ===
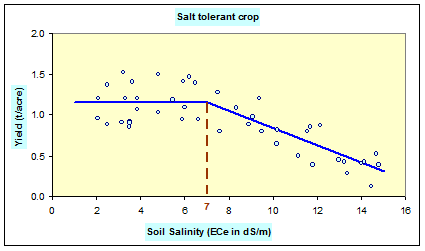
Maas–Hoffman model fitted to a data set. In this example the crop has a salt tolerance (threshold) of ECe=7 dS/m beyond which the yield declines.

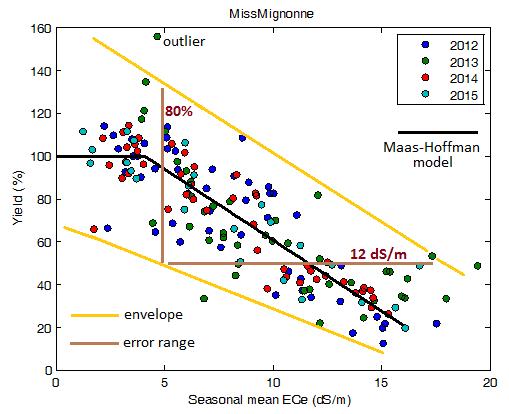
Data from Salt Farm Brochure. Boundaries (yellow) and error ranges (light brown) have been added. The scatter is quite high. It is not known whether the yield percentages were computed year by year (A), or for all years combined (B). In case B the error ranges are still larger due to annual yield differences. No analysis of variance (Anova) was done to prove that the Maas-Hoffman model really is a statistically significant improvement over a simple, straightforward, downward sloping linear regression model.

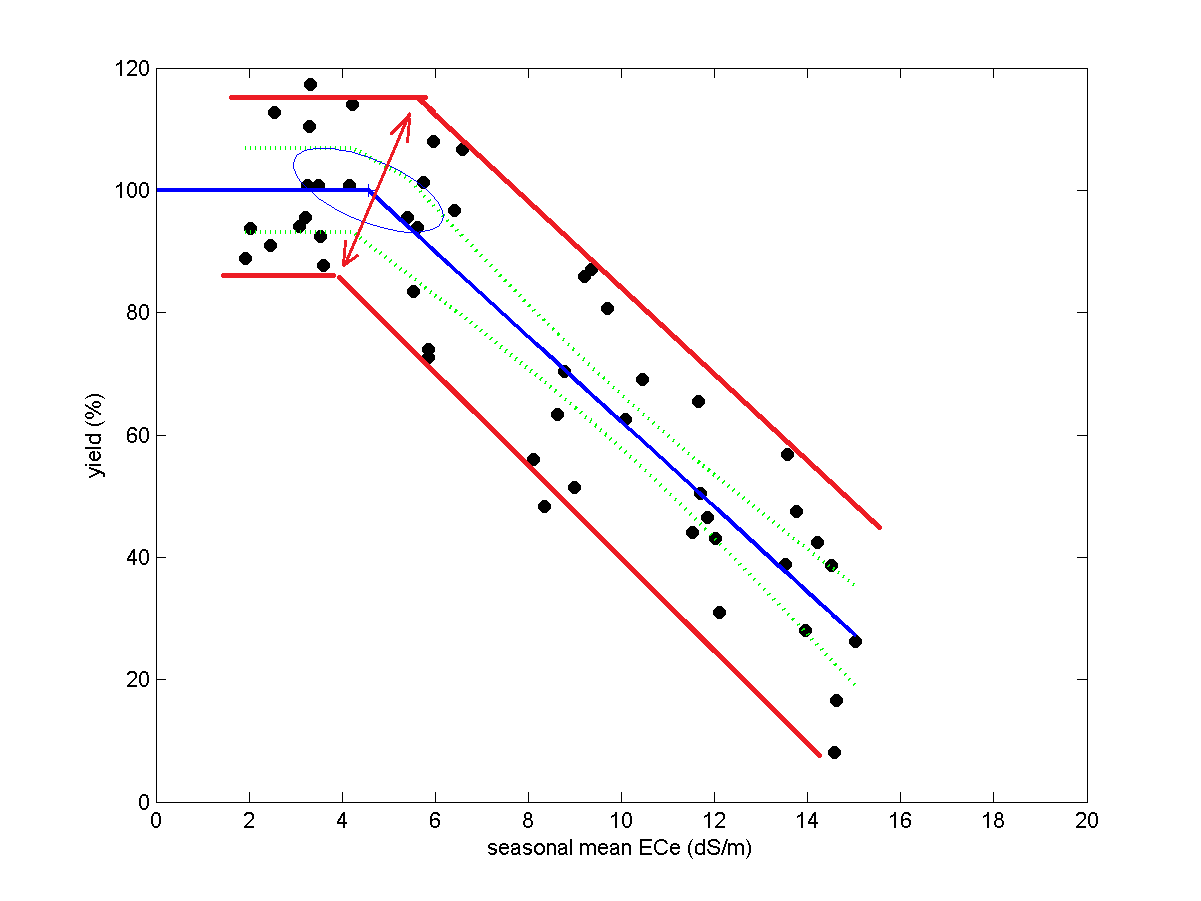
The Salt Farm Texel also published a graph of the yield-salinity relation of white cabbage. Boundary lines were added separately in red color. The boundaries suggest that the slope of the ellipse encompassing the confidence area of the breakpoint should be upward to the right instead of to the left. However the Texel document does not give an explanation of the construction of the ellipse.

The Salt Farm Texel uses the Maas–Hoffman model for crop response to soil salinity. The model uses a response function starting with a horizontal line connected further on to a downward sloping line. The connection point is also called threshold or tolerance. Up to the threshold the crop is not affected by soil salinity while beyond it the yield starts declining. The model is fitted to the data by piecewise linear regression.

=== Results ===
Crop	Variety ^)	Threshold *) (ECe in dS/m)	Class
Potato ^{x})	Mignonne ^{#})	4.1	slightly sensitive
Potato ^{x})	Achilles	2.9	sensitive
Potato ^{x})	Foc	2.1	sensitive
Potato ^{x})	Met	1.9	very sensitive
Potato ^{x})	"927"	3.4	sensitive
Carrot	Cas	4.5	slightly sensitive
Carrot	Ner	3.6	sensitive
Carrot	Nat	< 1	very sensitive
Carrot	Ben	< 1	very sensitive
Carrot	"101"	3.0	sensitive
Carrot	"102"	5.0	slightly sensitive
Carrot	Pri	2.1	sensitive
Onion	Alo	2.4	sensitive
Onion	Red	5.9	slightly sensitive
Onion	San	3.2	sensitive
Onion	Hyb	3.4	sensitive
Lettuce	Batavia H	< 1	very sensitive
Lettuce	Batavia S	2.3	sensitive
Lettuce	Butterhead L	1.8	very sensitive
Cabbage	White cabbage ^{#})	4.6	slightly sensitive
Cabbage	Broccoli	5.6	slightly sensitive
Barley	Que 2014	3.3	sensitive ^{+})
Barley	Que 2015	1.7	very sensitive ^{+})

^) Many variety names are uncommon as they consist of 3 letters only
*) It is not known what the results would have been if the planting was not done under fresh water conditions but in saline conditions.
^{#}) Graphs with scatter plots are shown in the report for these two varieties only. They show considerable variation both in Y (Yield) and X (ECe) direction.
^{x}) For potato only one comparable value is known in literature, namely for the very sensitive variety white rose having a threshold of 1.7 dS/m
^{+}) For barley, in contrast, the U.S. Salinity Laboratory mentions a threshold value of ECe = 8 dS/m, which makes it a tolerant crop

=== Summary ===
The highest tolerance is found for the onion variety "Red" which classifies as slightly sensitive. All crops classify in the range from very sensitive over sensitive to slightly sensitive. There is no crop classified as tolerant, not even moderately tolerant.

=== S-curve model ===
In the Texel report, also the Van Genuchten-Gupta model (giving an S-curve) was used to find the soil salinity at the 90% yield point. The rationale for this was not given.

== Halophytes ==
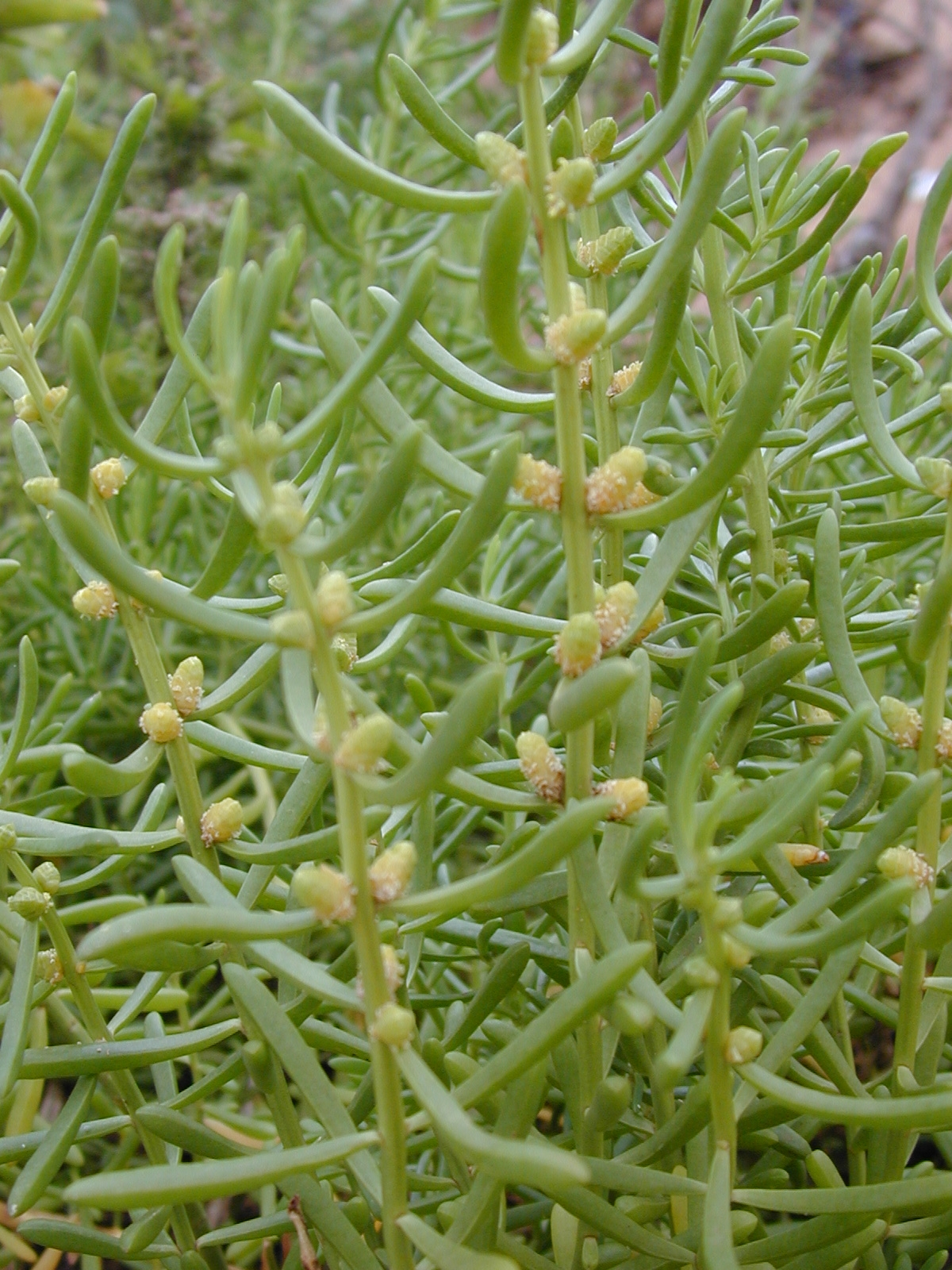
Turtleweed

Halophytes, or salt-loving plants, can be irrigated with pure seawater with the aim to grow fodder crops. A trial was made by Glenn et al. to use halophytes for feeding of sheep and it was concluded that the animals thrived well.

Setting the yield of an alfalfa (lucerne) fodder crop irrigated with fresh water (2 kg/m^{2}) at 100%, the following results were obtained for the yield of halophytic crops irrigated with seawater:

Crop	Relative yield (%)
Atriplex lentiformis, quailbush	90
Pickleweed, turtleweed	89
Suaeda sp., sea blite	88
Dwarf glasswort, Salicornia bigelovii	87
Sesuvium portulacastrum, sea purslane	85
Distichlis palmeri, Palmers grass	65
Atriplex cinerea, coast salt bush	45

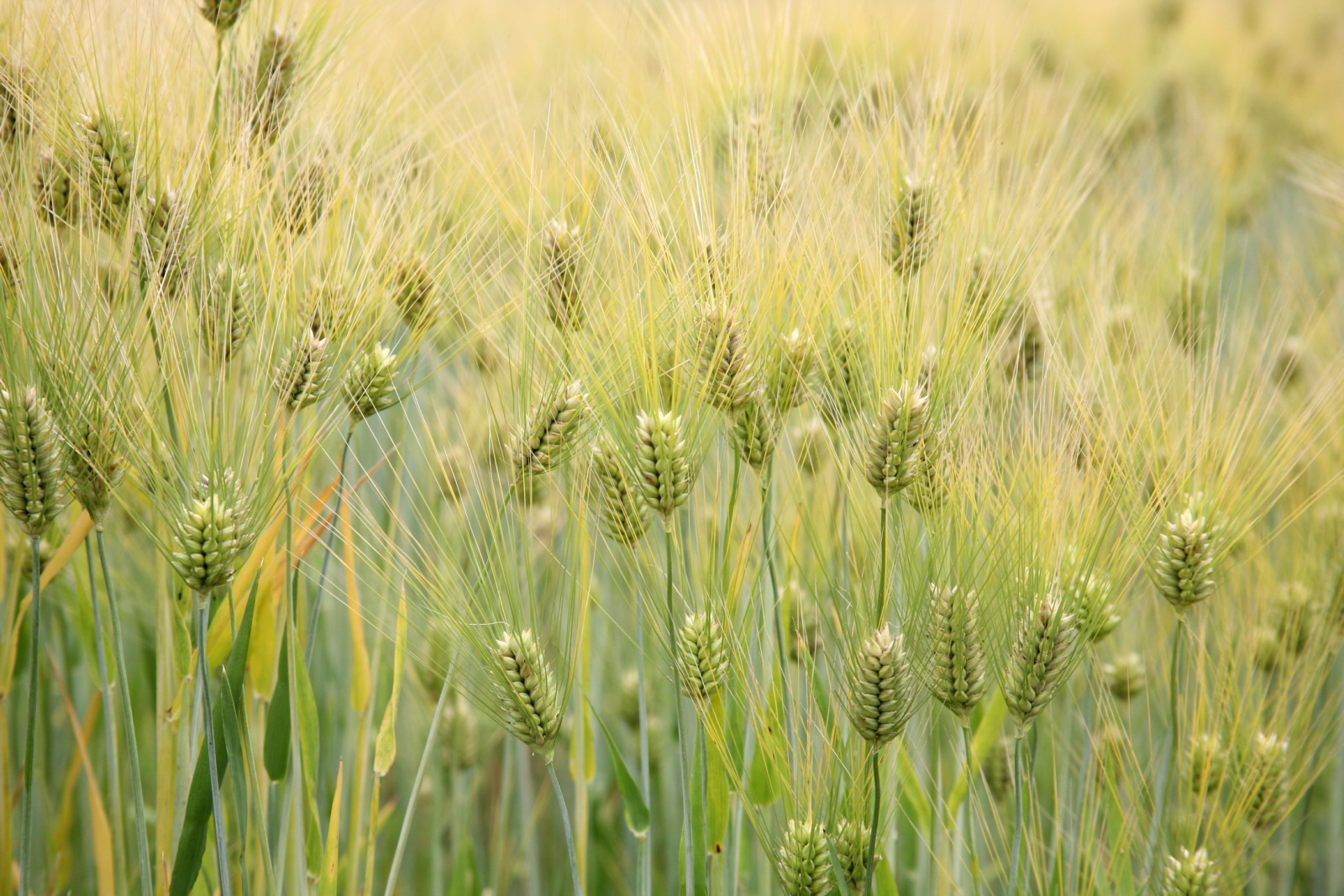
Barley (Hordeum vulgare)

== Barley ==
After selecting the most salt tolerant cultivar, the University of California at Davis has grown barley irrigated with pure seawater and obtained half the normal yield per acre, i.e. half of the average yield per acre at national level. The experiment was conducted at Bodega Bay, North of San Francisco, in a laboratory on the Pacific Ocean.

== Rice ==
Liu Shiping's team at Yangzhou University created rice varieties that can be grown in salt water, and achieve yields of 6.5 to 9.3 tons per hectare. As of 2021, seawater rice had been planted on 400,000 ha (990,000 acres) in soils with up to 4 grams of salt per kilogram, with yields averaging 8.8 tons per hectare, according to Qingdao Saline-Alkali Tolerant Rice Research and Development Center.

== Lettuce, chard and chicory ==
In a recent trial comparing three seawater and freshwater blends (i.e. 5–10–15% of seawater), some scientists found that lettuce productivity was negatively affected by 10% and 15% blends of seawater, whereas chard and chicory's growth was not affected by any blend. Interestingly, water consumption dropped and WUE significantly increased in every tested crop accordingly with increased seawater concentrations. They concluded that certain amounts of seawater can be practically used in hydroponics, allowing freshwater savings and increasing concentrations of certain mineral nutrients.

== See also ==
- Alkali soil – Soil type with pH > 8.5
- Biosalinity – Use of salty water for irrigation
- Halophyte – Salt-tolerant plant
- Halotolerance – Adaptation of living organisms to conditions of high salinity
- Sodium in biology
- Soil salinity – Salt content in the soil
- Soil salinity control – Controlling the problem of soil salinity
