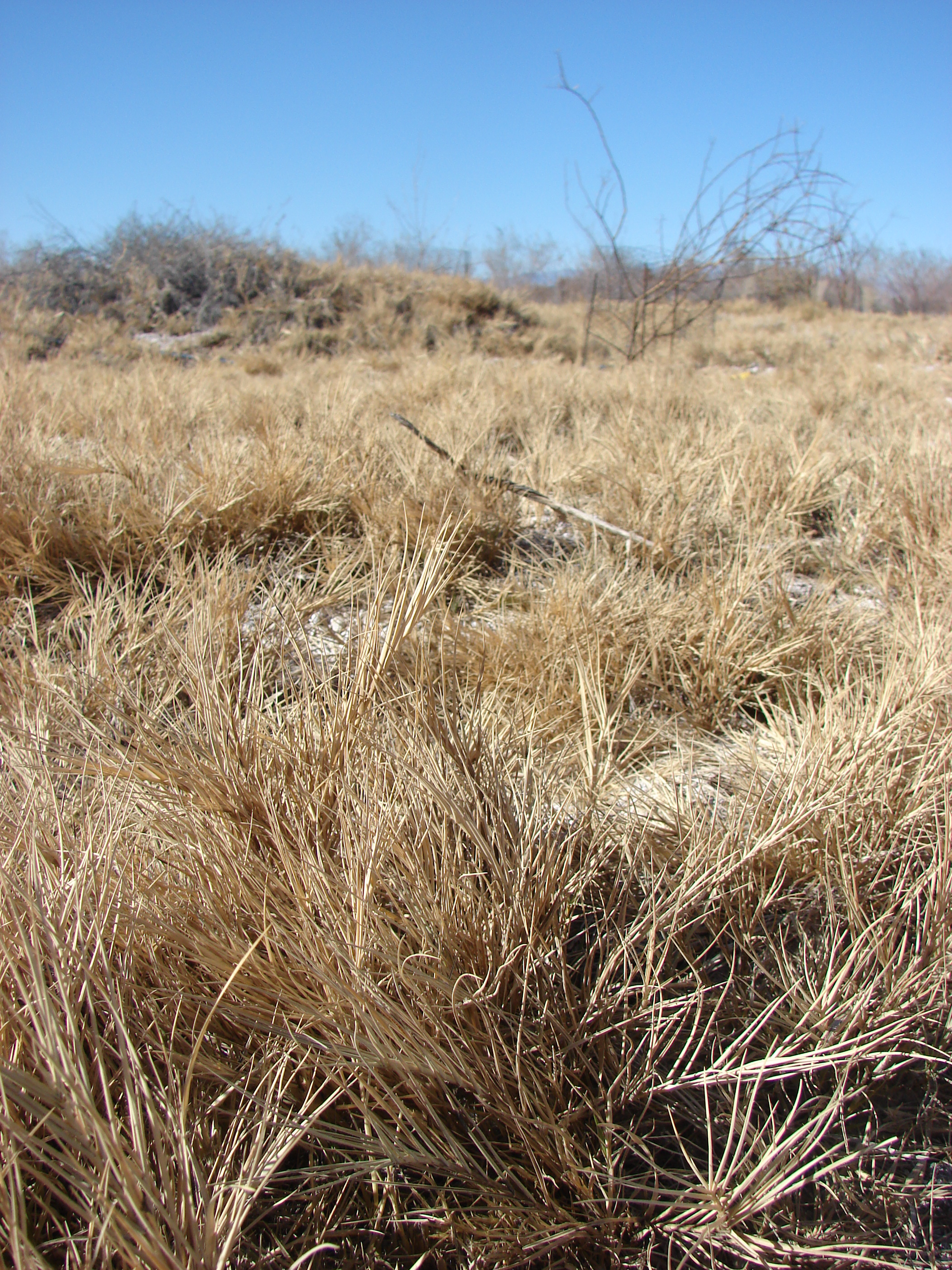
- Distichlis spicata

Scientific classification
- Kingdom: Plantae
- Clade: Tracheophytes
- Clade: Angiosperms
- Clade: Monocots
- Clade: Commelinids
- Order: Poales
- Family: Poaceae
- Subfamily: Chloridoideae
- Tribe: Cynodonteae
- Subtribe: Monanthochloinae; Pilg. ex Potztal
- Genus: Distichlis; Raf.

Type species
- Distichlis maritima (syn of D. spicata) Raf.

Synonyms
- Reederochloa Soderstr. & H.F.Decker; Monanthochloe Engelm.; Halochloa Griseb. 1879, illegitimate homonym not Kütz. 1843; Brizopyrum J.Presl 1830, illegitimate homonym not Link 1827 nor Stapf 1898

= Distichlis =

Genus of grasses

Distichlis is a genus of American and Australian plants in the grass family. Plants in this genus are dioecious, have rhizomes or stolons, and have conspicuously distichous leaves.

== Species ==
Species included in Distichlis include:

- Distichlis acerosa (Griseb.) H.L.Bell & Columbus – Argentina
- Distichlis australis (Speg.) Villamil – Argentina
- Distichlis bajaensis H.L.Bell – Mexico
- Distichlis distichophylla (Labill.) Fassett – Australia
- Distichlis eludens (Soderstr. & H.F.Decker) H.L.Bell & Columbus – Durango, Zacatecas, San Luis Potosí
- Distichlis humilis Phil. – Peru, Bolivia, Chile, Argentina
- Distichlis laxiflora Hack. – Argentina
- Distichlis littoralis (Engelm.) H.L.Bell & Columbus – California, Texas, Louisiana, Florida, Mexico, Bahamas, Cuba
- Distichlis palmeri (Vasey) Fassett ex I.M.Johnst. – Baja California, Sonora
- Distichlis scoparia (Kunth) Arechav. – Chile, Argentina, Uruguay
- Distichlis spicata (L.) Greene – from Newfoundland + Northwest Territories to Uruguay including Bahamas, Greater Antilles, Galápagos

== Formerly included ==
Species formerly included in Distichlis include:

- Distichlis ammobia – Poa obvallata
- Distichlis condensata – Eragrostis condensata
- Distichlis multinervosa – Vaseyochloa multinervosa
- Distichlis sudanensis – Aeluropus lagopoides
- Distichlis texana – Allolepis texana
- Distichlis volckmannii – Poa cumingii
