= Uniola condensata =

Conservation status
- Endangered (IUCN 3.1)

Scientific classification
- Kingdom: Plantae
- Clade: Tracheophytes
- Clade: Angiosperms
- Clade: Monocots
- Clade: Commelinids
- Order: Poales
- Family: Poaceae
- Subfamily: Chloridoideae
- Genus: Uniola
- Species: U. condensata

Binomial name
- Uniola condensata Hitchc.

Species of grass

Uniola condensata is a species of grass in the family Poaceae. It is found only in Ecuador.
