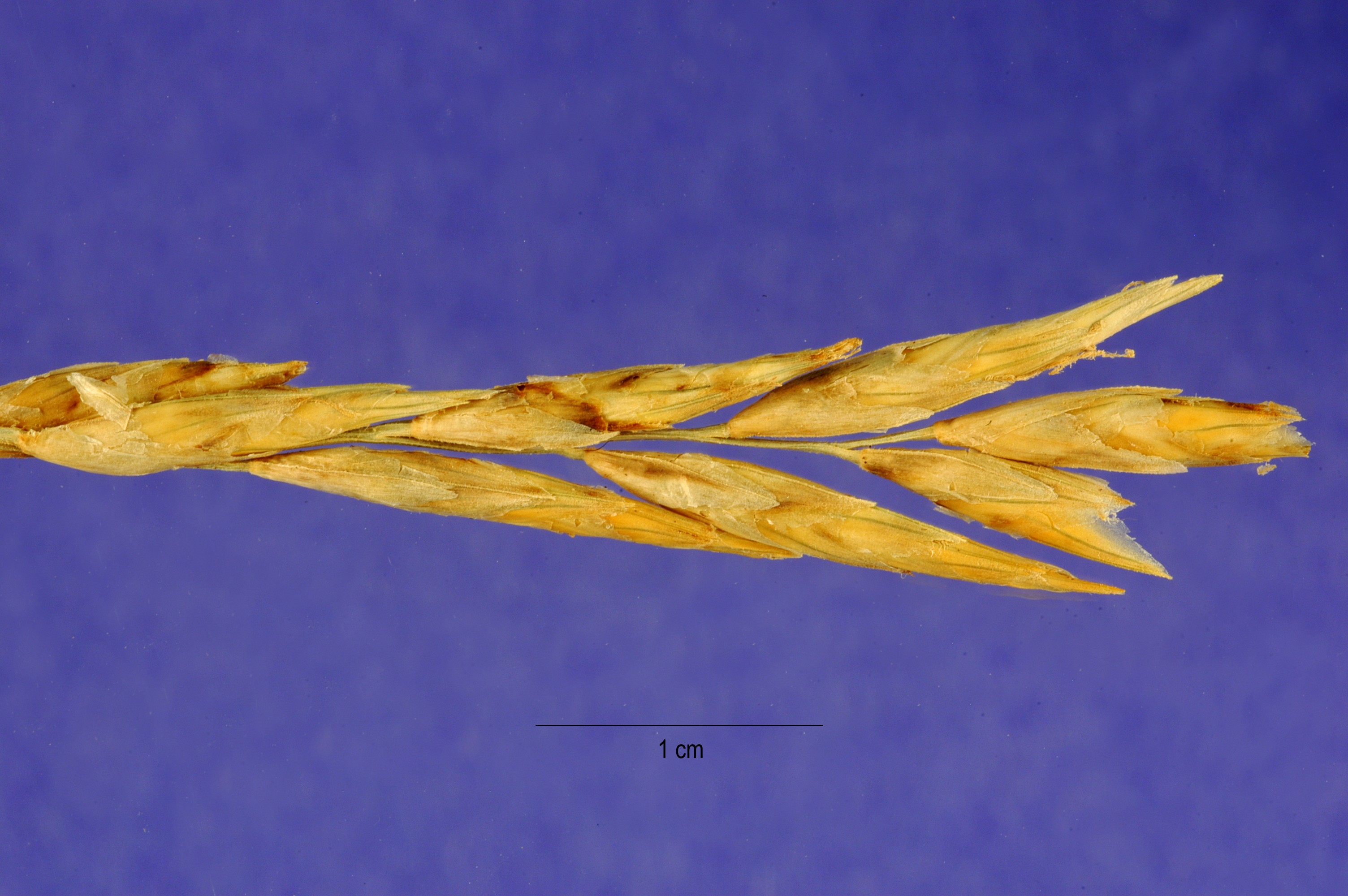

Scientific classification
- Kingdom: Plantae
- Clade: Tracheophytes
- Clade: Angiosperms
- Clade: Monocots
- Clade: Commelinids
- Order: Poales
- Family: Poaceae
- Subfamily: Chloridoideae
- Tribe: Cynodonteae
- Genus: Allolepis; Soderstr. & H.F.Decker
- Species: A. texana

Binomial name
- Allolepis texana (Vasey) Soderstr. & H.F.Decker

Synonyms
- Poa texana Vasey; Sieglingia wrightii Vasey; Distichlis texana (Vasey) Scribn.

= Allolepis =

Genus of flowering plants

Allolepis is a genus of North American plants in the grass family. The only known species is Allolepis texana (Texas false saltgrass).

Allolepis texana is similar to Distichlis spp. It is a dioecious, perennial herb reproducing by means of stolons running along the surface of the ground. Stems are glabrous, up to 70 cm (28 in) tall. Leaf blades are flat or somewhat folded, up to 43 cm (17 in) long and 6 mm (1/4 in) wide. The inflorescence is a tight panicle up to 6 cm (2 1/2 in) long with 5–70 spikelets. Staminate plants have up to 20 flowers per spikelet, pistillate plants only 5–9.

All of the known US populations are staminate (male), lacking female flowers, reproducing vegetatively.

== Distribution and habitat ==
The species is native to western Texas and northern Mexico (Chihuahua, Coahuila, Durango, Tamaulipas).

It grows on sandy and silty soils of river bottoms and floodplains.

== See also ==
- List of Poaceae genera
