= Satyandra K. Gupta =

Aerospace and Mechanical Engineer

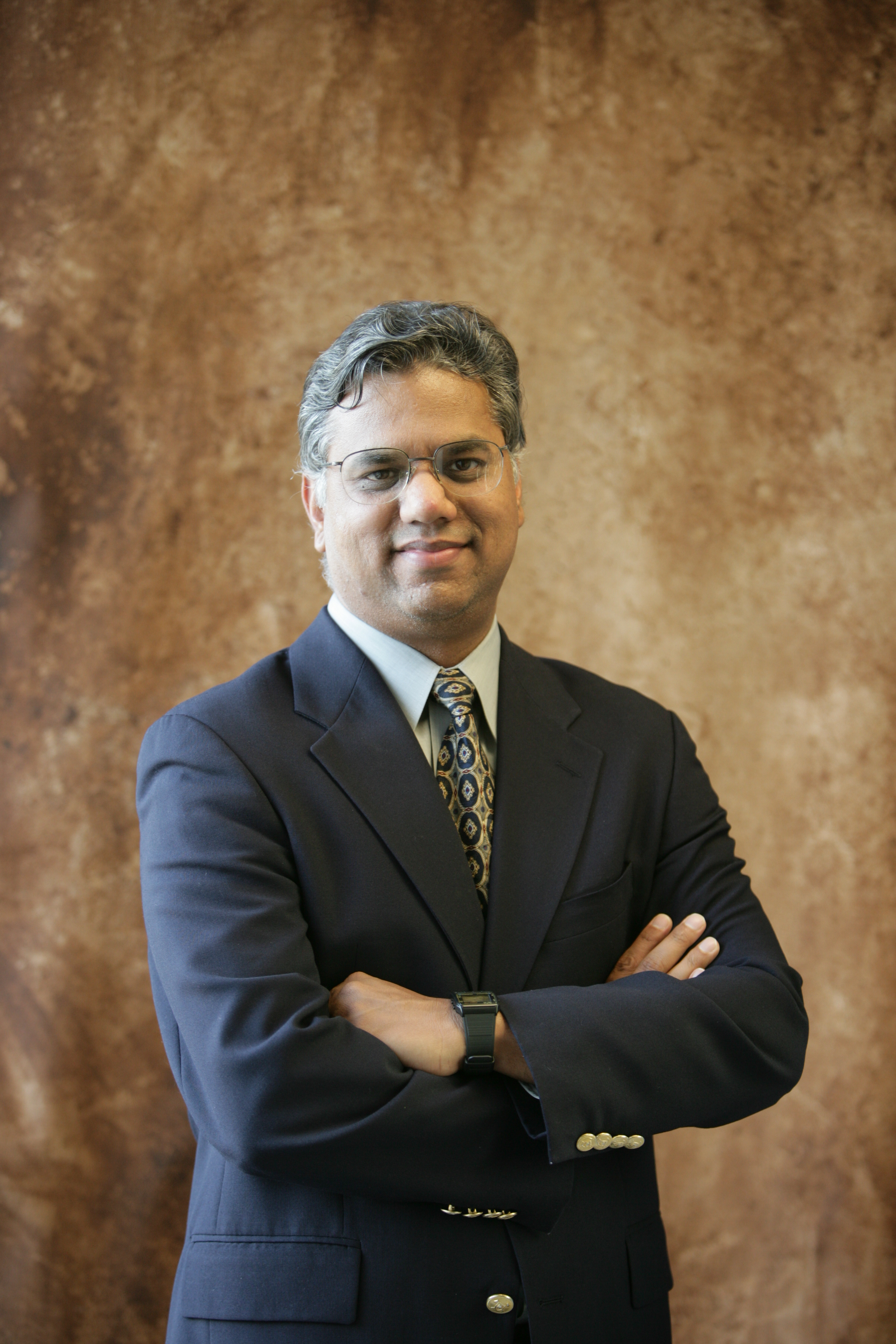
- Citizenship: United States
- Education: University of Maryland, College Park; Indian Institute of Technology, Delhi; Indian Institute of Technology, Roorkee
- Known for: Van Genuchten–Gupta model
- Scientific career
- Workplaces: University of Southern California; University of Maryland, College Park; Carnegie Mellon University

Dr. Satyandra K. Gupta is a researcher and educator working in the field of automation and robotics. He started his career as a Research Scientist in the Robotics Institute at Carnegie Mellon University in 1995. He moved to the University of Maryland, College Park in 1998 as an Assistant Professor of Mechanical Engineering. He was appointed as the founding director of the Maryland Robotics Center in 2010. He was appointed as a Program Director for National Robotics Initiative at National Science Foundation and served in this role from 2012 to 2014. He was appointed as a member of the Task Force on Defense Science Board Summer Study on Autonomy in 2015 He joined the University of Southern California in 2016. He currently holds Smith International Professorship of Mechanical Engineering and serves as the founding Director of the Center for Advanced Manufacturing at Viterbi School of Engineering at the University of Southern California. He is known for his research in manufacturing automation, robotics, and computer-aided design. He was appointed as the Editor for Journal of Computing and Information Science in Engineering in 2017 by American Society of Mechanical Engineers (ASME) and the Editor-in-Chief for Advanced Manufacturing Book Series by World Scientific Publishing Company in 2016.

== Education ==
He received a bachelor's degree from the University of Roorkee (currently known as the Indian Institute of Technology, Roorkee), Master's degree from the Indian Institute of Technology, Delhi, and a Ph.D. in Mechanical Engineering from the University of Maryland, College Park.

== Awards, Achievements, and Media Coverage ==
Dr. Gupta received Presidential Early Career Award for Scientists and Engineers (PECASE) Award from President George W. Bush in 2001 at a ceremony in the White House. He was elected a fellow of American Society of Mechanical Engineers (ASME) in 2007 for his contribution to the field of automation and Society of Manufacturing Engineers Fellow. He was also elected a fellow of Institute of Electrical and Electronics Engineers (IEEE) in 2020 for his contributions to the development of decision-making tools for manufacturing automation. He was conferred Kos Ishii-Toshiba Award in 2011 and Excellence in Research Award in 2013 by ASME to recognize his outstanding research contributions. He was honored as a Distinguished Alumnus by the Indian Institute of Technology Roorkee in 2014. He was named among the 20 most influential professors in smart manufacturing in May 2020 by SME

He led development of RoboRaven, the first robotic bird capable of flying outdoor using independent wing control and performing aerobatic maneuvers and RoboSAM, the first smart robotic assistant in manufacturing applications that was capable of assessing its own confidence in performing a given task and calling for help when needed. Dr. Gupta is often quoted by media on topics related to Automation and Robotics. He testified at “Make It in America” Hearing for US House of Representatives.

== Research interests ==
Dr. Gupta's interest is in the area of physics-aware decision-making to facilitate automation. He is specifically interested in decision-making in the context of Computer-Aided Design, Manufacturing Automation, and Robotics. These applications often involve model uncertainty, complex physics, and fast decision-making speeds. He develops decision-making approaches that combine heuristic-aided discrete state-space search and non-linear optimization to produce high-quality decisions by the required decision-making deadlines.

== Publications ==
Dr. Gupta has written more than three hundred and fifty technical articles. He is the co-author of the book titled "Integrated product and process design and development: the product realization process" He also co-authored the book titled "Training in Virtual Environments: A Safe, Cost-Effective, and Engaging Approach to Training". He was awarded two US patent titled "Apparatus and Method for Multi-Part Setup Planning for Sheet Metal Bending Operations" in 2001, and "Surface vehicle trajectory planning systems, devices, and methods" in 2018. He also writes Pursuit of Unorthodox Ideas Blog.
