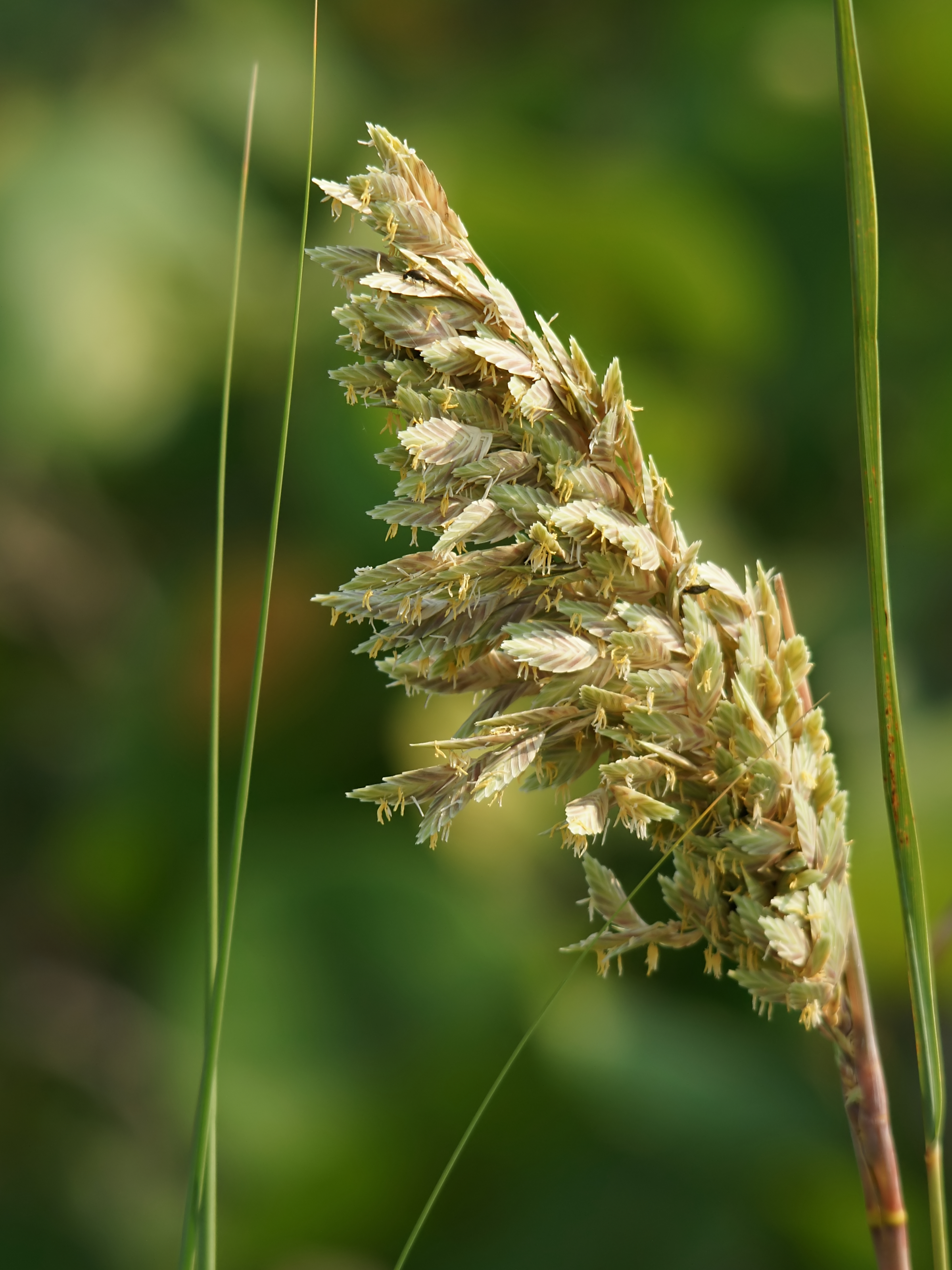

Conservation status
- Secure (NatureServe)

Scientific classification
- Kingdom: Plantae
- Clade: Tracheophytes
- Clade: Angiosperms
- Clade: Monocots
- Clade: Commelinids
- Order: Poales
- Family: Poaceae
- Subfamily: Chloridoideae
- Genus: Uniola
- Species: U. paniculata

Binomial name
- Uniola paniculata L.

= Uniola paniculata =

Sea oats

Species of flowering plant

Uniola paniculata, also known as sea oats, seaside oats, araña, and arroz de costa, is a tall subtropical grass that is an important component of coastal sand dune and beach plant communities in the southeastern United States, eastern Mexico and some Caribbean islands. Its large seed heads that turn golden brown in late summer give the plant its common name. Its tall leaves trap wind-blown sand and promote sand dune growth, while its deep roots and extensive rhizomes act to stabilize them, so the plant helps protect beaches and property from damage due to high winds, storm surges and tides. It also provides food and habitat for birds, small animals and insects.

== Description ==
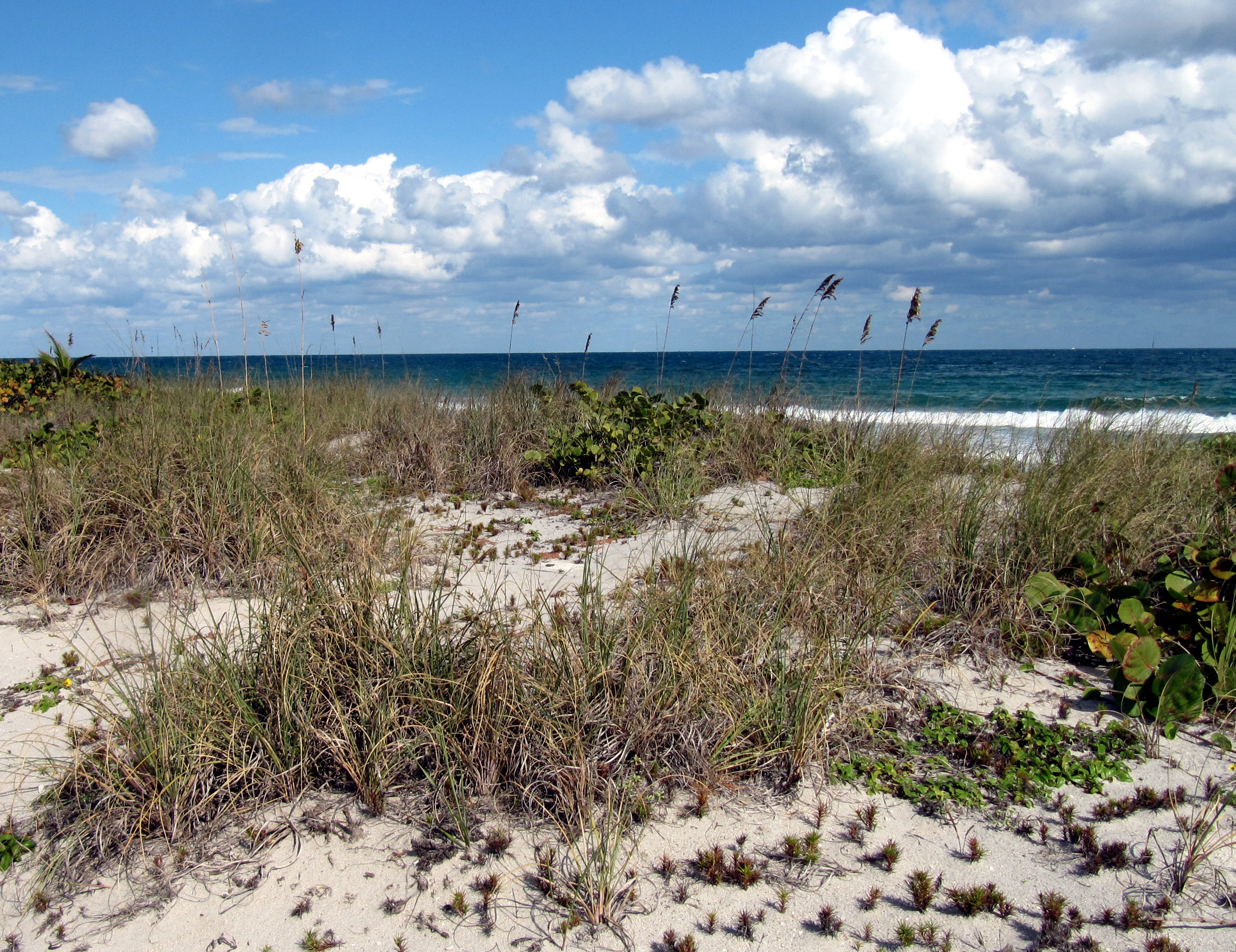
Uniola paniculata on a sand dune crest at Dr. Von D. Mizell-Eula Johnson State Park, Florida.

Uniola paniculata is a tall, erect perennial grass that can grow to 1 to 2 m (3.3 to 6.6 ft) in height. Its long, thin leaves reach lengths of 20 to 40 cm (8 to 15.5 in) and are about 0.6 cm (0.24 in) in width, tapering to a pointed apex. The plant produces inflorescences of flat spikelets, each of which contains 10 to 12 wind-pollinated florets. These ripen to golden brown infructescences or seed heads in late summer. The seeds are dispersed by wind and can be carried long distances by storms and ocean currents, but reproduction commonly occurs vegetatively by forming buds around stem bases.

The plant forms dense surface roots and penetrating deep roots that are colonized by beneficial organisms such as mycorrhizal fungi. Rhizomes are elongate and produce extensive lateral growth. They root readily when buried in sand.

Uniola paniculata uses a C_{4} pathway for carbon fixation.

== Distribution and habitat ==
Uniola paniculata is found on beach fronts and barrier islands along the Atlantic Coast from New Jersey to Florida, and the Gulf Coast from Florida to Tabasco, Mexico. The range of Uniola paniculata along the US Atlantic coastline is expanding northward. It also occurs in the Bahamas and northwestern Cuba. It grows primarily on foredunes and dune crests. It is uncommon in swales between dunes where salt spray is limited, and it is rarely found inland.

== Growing conditions ==
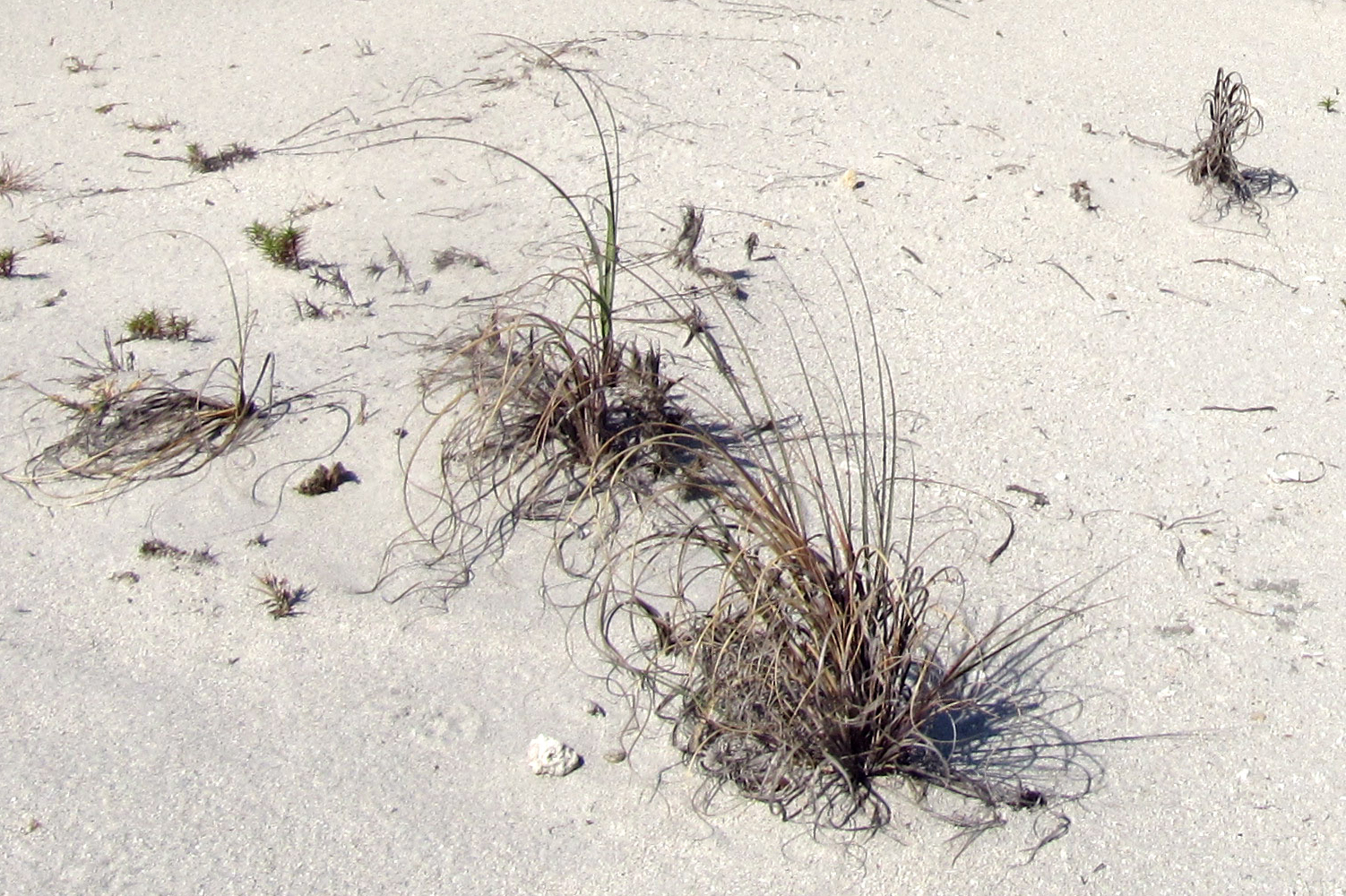
U. paniculata colonizing a sand dune at Dr. Von D. Mizell-Eula Johnson State Park, Florida.

Due to the harsh conditions in which it grows, U. paniculata has little competition from other plants. It is heat tolerant and highly resistant to drought, salinity and brief inundation by sea water. It grows in loose sand rather than finer-grained silty or clay-rich soils and does not tolerate water-logging. The plants tend to trap blowing sand, and burial of the plant base by sand stimulates growth and helps the plant spread by tacking down the rhizomes.

Uniola paniculata is adversely affected by urban encroachment. Treated and untreated sewage, urban runoff and pollution from marinas all impact the plant. Off-road vehicles and foot traffic damage the plants, disrupt their roots and compact the sand. Loss of the plants leads to erosion and loss of protective dunes.

== Uses ==
Sea oats are well suited to saline environments, and as such, are important to barrier island ecology and are often used in sand stabilization projects because their long root structure firmly holds loose sand. For example, in Fort Lauderdale, Florida, colonies of sea oats have been planted at several beaches. The oats are a crucial component of the area's hurricane defense strategy and have helped to stave off damage from tropical storms. The sea oat colonies and nascent dune structure they support are expected to flourish.

== Legal protection ==
Sea oats are a protected grass in several states along the southeastern Atlantic coast. Picking or disturbing sea oats is punishable by fine in Georgia, South Carolina, and North Carolina. Florida by law also prohibits interfering with sea oats and protects nurserymen that grow sea oats.

== Wildlife habitat ==
Seeds of U. paniculata provide food for red-winged blackbirds, sparrows and other songbirds, as well as marsh rabbits and mice.
