= Distichlis distichophylla =

Scientific classification
- Kingdom: Plantae
- Clade: Tracheophytes
- Clade: Angiosperms
- Clade: Monocots
- Clade: Commelinids
- Order: Poales
- Family: Poaceae
- Subfamily: Chloridoideae
- Genus: Distichlis
- Species: D. distichophylla

Binomial name
- Distichlis distichophylla (Labill.) Fassett

Synonyms
- Distichlis maritima Raf.

Species of plant

Distichlis distichophylla is a species of grass commonly known as Australian salt-grass, emu grass or pineapple grass. It is a dioecious perennial plant that grows to about 30 cm in height, with creeping rhizomes up to 1 m long. It is coarse and prickly, growing in damp, saline areas such as the fringes of saltmarshes. It often forms mats where water is abundant. Its appearance in places from which it had been absent can be an indication of rising soil salinity.
