= Salt tolerance of crops =

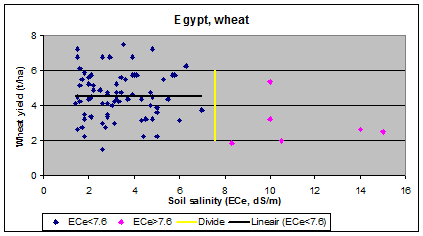
The irrigated wheat crop in Egypt has a salt tolerance of ECe=7.6 dS/m beyond which the yield declines. The data were collected in farmers' fields.

Salt tolerance of crops is the maximum salt level a crop tolerates without losing its productivity while it is affected negatively at higher levels. The salt level is often taken as the soil salinity or the salinity of the irrigation water.

Salt tolerance is of importance in irrigated lands in (semi)arid regions where the soil salinity problem can be extensive as a result of the salinization occurring here. It concerns hundreds of millions of hectares. A regional distribution of the 3,230,000 km^{2} of saline land worldwide is shown in salt affected area based on the FAO/UNESCO Soil Map of the World.

Additionally, in areas where sprinkler irrigation is practiced, salty sprinkler water can cause considerable damage by leaf burning, whether the soil is saline or not.

== History ==
One of the first studies made on soil salinity and plant response was published in the USDA Agriculture Handbook No. 60, 1954. More than 20 years later Maas and Hoffman published the results of an extensive study on salt tolerance. In 2001, a Canadian study provided a substantial amount of additional data. A comprehensive survey of tolerances reported worldwide was made by the FAO in 2002.

Most studies were made with pot or drum experiments or in lysimeters under controlled conditions. The collection of field data under farmers' conditions was rare, probably due to the greater efforts and higher costs involved, the lack of control of plant growing conditions other than soil salinity, and the larger random variation in crop yields and soil salinity. Yet, with statistical methods, it is possible to detect the tolerance level from field data. Salt Farm Texel, a Dutch-based research company has identified various crops that have considerable amount of salt tolerance.

== Classification ==
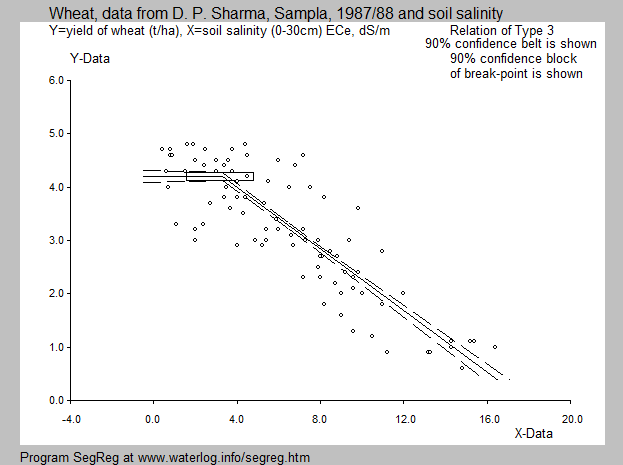
Maas–Hoffman model for wheat production and soil salinity in farmland. The salt tolerance (breakpoint, threshold) is about ECe = 3.3 dS/m

Soil and water salinity can be expressed in various ways. The most common parameter used in soil salinity is the electric conductivity of the extract (ECe) of a saturated soil paste in units of deciSiemens per metre (dS/m) (previously measured in millimhos per centimeter (mmho/cm)). Bernstein presented the following soil classification based on ECe in dS/m:

ECe 0–2 non-saline soil
ECe 2–4 slightly saline, yield of sensitive crops reduced
ECe 4–8 moderately saline, yield reduction of many crops
ECe 8–16 saline, normal yield for salt tolerant crops only
ECe > 16 reasonable crop yields only for very tolerant crops

== Modeling ==
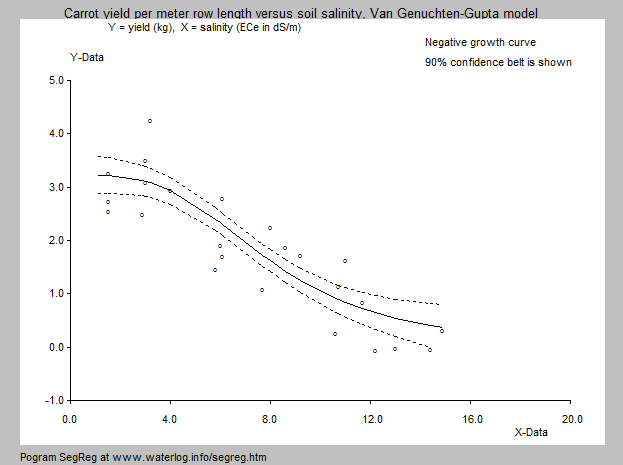
Van Genuchten–Gupta model for carrot production and soil salinity in the field

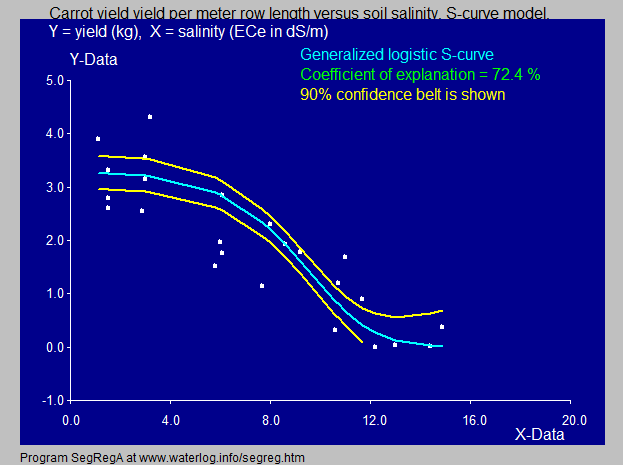
Logistic sigmoid model for carrot production and soil salinity in the field

A common way to present crop – salinity data is according to the Maas–Hoffman model (see above figure): initially a horizontal line connected to a downward sloping line. The breakpoint is also called threshold or tolerance. For field data with random variation the tolerance level can be found with segmented regression. As the Maas-Hoffman model is fitted to the data by the method of least squares, the data at the tail-end influence the position of the breakpoint.

Another method was described by Van Genuchten and Gupta. It uses an inverted S-curve as shown in the left-hand figure. This model recognizes that the tail-end may have a flatter slope than the middle part. It does not provide a sharp tolerance level.

Using the Maas–Hoffman model in situations with a flat trend in the tail-end may lead to a breakpoint with a low ECe value, owing to the employment of the condition to minimize the deviations of the model values from the observed values over the entire domain (i.e. including the tail-end).

Using the logistic sigmoid function for the same data applied in the van Genuchten-Gupta model, the curvature becomes more pronounced and a better fit is obtained.

A third model is based on the method of partial regression, whereby one finds the longest horizontal stretch (the range of no effect) of the yield-ECe relation while beyond that stretch the yield decline sets in (figure below). With this method the trend at the tail-end plays no role. As a result, the tolerance level (breakpoint, threshold) is larger (4.9 dS/m) than according to the Maas-Hoffman model (3.3 dS/m, see the second figure above with the same data). Also a better fit is achieved.

== Augmenting tolerance ==
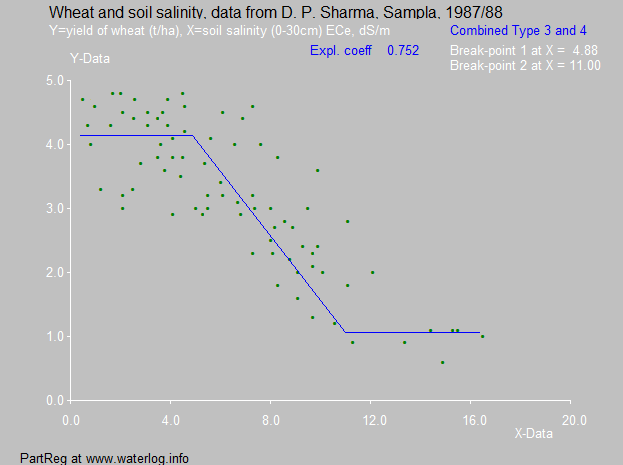
Partial regression is used to detect the maximum range of no influence in wheat fields. Tolerance is about ECe=5 dS/m

Presently a considerable amount of research is undertaken to develop agricultural crops with a higher salt tolerance to enhance crop cultivation in salinity stricken regions.

== Leaf damage ==
In Australia the following classification of sprinkler irrigation water salinity was developed:

Sensitivity	Chloride (mg/L)	Sodium (mg/L)	Affected crop
Sensitive	<178	<114	Almond, apricot, citrus, plum
Moderately Sensitive	178–355	114–229	Capsicum, grape, potato, tomato
Moderately tolerant	355–710	229–458	Barley, cucumber, sweetcorn
Tolerant	>710	>458	Cauliflower, cotton, safflower, sesame, sorghum, sunflower

== See also ==
- Biosalinity – Use of salty water for irrigation
- Crop tolerance to seawater – Quality in crops
- Halophyte – Salt-tolerant plant
- Halotolerance – Adaptation to high salinity
- Sea level rise – Rise in sea levels due to climate change
- Sodium in biology – Use of sodium by organisms
- Soil salinity – Salt content in the soil
- Soil salinity control – Controlling the problem of soil salinity
