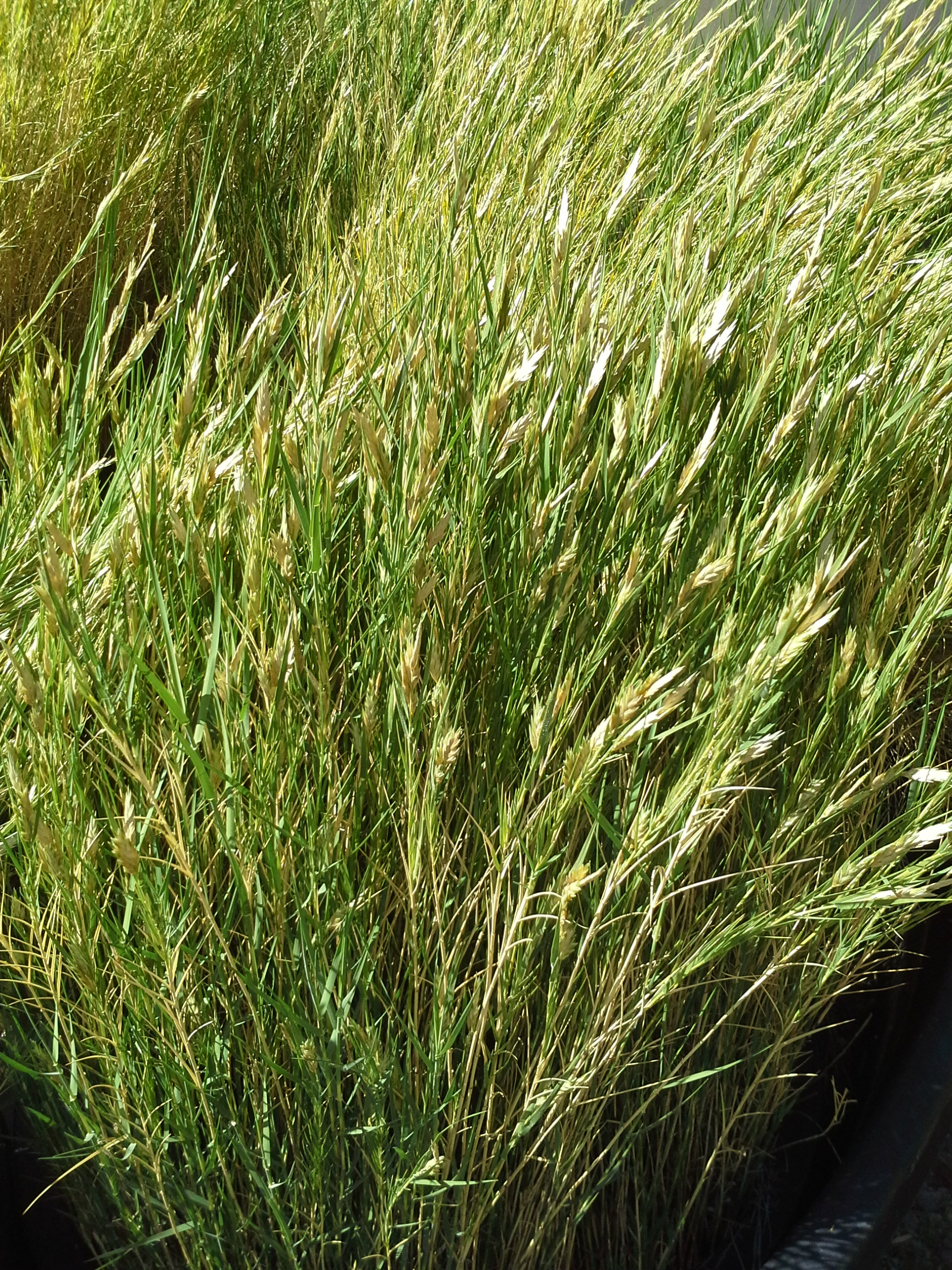

Scientific classification
- Kingdom: Plantae
- Clade: Embryophytes
- Clade: Tracheophytes
- Clade: Spermatophytes
- Clade: Angiosperms
- Clade: Monocots
- Clade: Commelinids
- Order: Poales
- Family: Poaceae
- Subfamily: Chloridoideae
- Genus: Distichlis
- Species: D. palmeri

Binomial name
- Distichlis palmeri (Vasey) Fassett ex I.M.Johnst.

Synonyms
- Basionym: Uniola palmeri Vasey

= Distichlis palmeri =

Species of grass

Distichlis palmeri is a species of perennial halophytic grass commonly known as nipa or Palmer saltgrass. It is a saltwater marsh grass endemic to the tidal marshes of the northern Gulf of California in Mexico.

== Description ==
Distichlis palmeri is an obligate emergent (it has aerenchyma) perennial rhizomatous dioecious halophytic C4 grass. Culms (stalks) are generally rigid and upright to about 60 cm (2 feet) and have short internodes. Longer culms become recumbent (lay down) developing young vertical culms from the nodes. These young culms may root. Acicular to linear leaves are upright and positioned alternate along the culm at nodes. Leaves excrete salts through specialized salt glands that are a component of D. palmeri leaf anatomy. These excreted surface salts are wicked away by breezes.

Anemophilous flowers emerge late winter. At anthesis, males liberate light chartreuse colored pollen in breezes. Female flowers are panicles of alternate spikelets that present lavender colored styles and stigmas. Kernels (seeds) are mature in early spring. Each panicle produces 20–30 mature caryopses.

== Distribution and habitat ==
Distichlis palmeri is endemic to the tidal marshes of Baja California and Sonora in the northern Gulf of California. In Baja California, this species occurs from the Colorado River Delta south to the Bahía de los Angeles and Isla Ángel de la Guarda.

== Ecology ==
D. palmeri is not drought tolerant. It does withstand surface drying between supra tidal events because roots extend downward to more than 1 meter (3 feet) where coastal substrata is still moist. Insects of the grasshopper family visit the plant. When maintained in a greenhouse, it is susceptible to aphid infestation.

== Uses ==
Kernels are similar to those of farro in color and size. Kernels of Distichlis palmeri have an indigenous history as a wild harvest grain (Nipa) consumed by the Cocopah. Nipa grain has size, nutritional value and flavor qualities similar to other cropped grains. In the last four decades, Nipa grain production through saline agriculture (agriculture that uses saline resources to farm halophytic cash crops) of D. palmeri has been the subject of domestication studies.

In addition to research studies working to domesticate D. palmeri, the species has been used to manage farm drainage and has been proposed as a constructive use plant in remediation of saline and biosaline wastewaters and land. Distichlis palmeri can grow in open hot full sun on saline irrigation in subtropic zones; hence, it can be cropped along warming and rising coastlines and is an active candidate for (bio)saline agriculture and cash crop development of Nipa grain.
