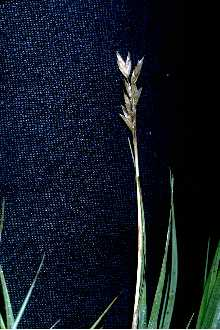

Scientific classification
- Kingdom: Plantae
- Clade: Tracheophytes
- Clade: Angiosperms
- Clade: Monocots
- Clade: Commelinids
- Order: Poales
- Family: Poaceae
- Subfamily: Chloridoideae
- Genus: Distichlis
- Species: D. spicata

Binomial name
- Distichlis spicata (L.) Greene

Synonyms
- Distichlis stricta (Torr.) Rydb.; Uniola stricta Torr.

= Distichlis spicata =

Species of grass

Distichlis spicata is a species of grass known by several common names, including seashore saltgrass, inland saltgrass, and desert saltgrass. This grass is native to the Americas, where it is widespread. It can be found on other continents as well, where it is naturalized. It is extremely salt tolerant.

== Distribution and habitat ==
Distichlis spicata thrives along coastlines and on salt flats and disturbed soils, as well as forest, woodland, montane, and desert scrub habitats. It can form dense monotypic stands, and it often grows in clonal colonies. Non-clonal populations tend to be skewed toward a majority of one sex or the other. The grass forms sod with its hearty root system. Its rhizomes have sharp points which allow it to penetrate hard soils and aerenchymous tissues, which allow it to grow underwater and in mud.

This plant grows easily in salty and alkaline soils, excreting salts from its tissues via salt glands.

== Description ==
Distichlis spicata is a hardy perennial with rhizomes and sometimes stolons. It is an erect grass which occasionally approaches half a meter in height but is generally shorter. The solid, stiff stems have narrow leaves up to 10 centimeters in length, which may be crusted with salt in saline environments.

This species is dioecious, meaning the male flowers and female flowers grow on separate individuals. The pistillate inflorescence may be up to 8 centimeters long, with green or purple-tinted spikelets. The staminate flowers look quite similar, thinner but larger overall and denser. The flower parts of both sex may be bright pinkish-purple.

== Uses ==
Because it gets rid of excess salt by secreting it onto its surfaces, the Kawaiisu Indians were able to make salt blocks by scraping off the salt.

"Under favorable soil and moisture conditions, studies have shown Saltgrass favorable for pastures irrigated with saline water. The total dry matter yields were 9081 kg/ha with a total protein production of 1300 kg/ha. Saltgrass is grazed by both cattle and horses and it has a forage value of fair to good because it remains green when most other grasses are dry during the drought periods and it is resistant to grazing and trampling. It is cropped both when green and in the dry state; however, it is most commonly used the winter for livestock feed. Saltgrass along the Atlantic coast was the primary source of hay for the early colonists."
