= Van Genuchten–Gupta model =

The Van Genuchten–Gupta model is an inverted S-curve applicable to crop yield and soil salinity relations. It is named after Martinus Theodore van Genuchten and Satyandra K. Gupta's work from the 1990s.

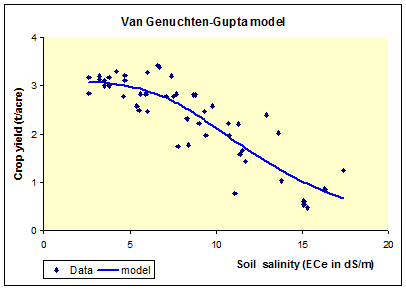
Van Genuchten-Gupta model for crop response to soil salinity.

== Equation ==
The mathematical expression is:

$$Y = \frac{Y_{\rm m} }{1 + (C / C_{50})^P }$$

where Y is the yield, Y_{m} is the maximum yield of the model, C is salt concentration of the soil, C_{50} is the C value at 50% yield, and P is an exponent to be found by optimization and maximizing the model's goodness of fit to the data.

In the figure: Y_{m} = 3.1, C_{50} = 12.4, P = 3.75

== Alternative one ==
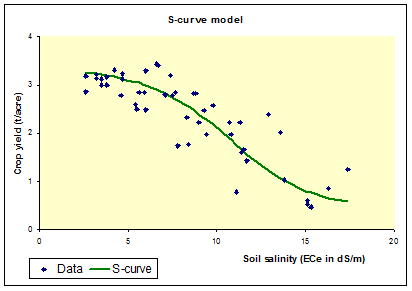
Logistic S-curve model for the relation between crop yield and soil salinity

As an alternative, the logistic S-function can be used.

The mathematical expression is:

$$Y^{\wedge} = \frac{1 }{1 + \exp(A X^C + B) }$$

where:

$$Y^{\wedge} = \frac{Y-Y_{\rm n} }{Y_{\rm m}-Y_{\rm n} }$$

with Y being the yield, Y_{n} the minimum Y, Y_{m} the maximum Y, X the salt concentration of the soil, while A, B and C are constants to be determined by optimization and maximizing the model's goodness of fit to the data.

If the minimum Y_{n}=0 then the expression can be simplified to:

$$Y = \frac{Y_{\rm m} }{1 + \exp(A X^C + B)}$$

In the figure: Y_{m} = 3.43, Y_{n} = 0.47, A = 0.112, B = -3.16, C = 1.42.

== Alternative two ==
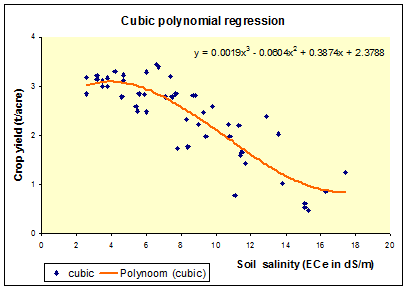
Cubic regression to find the relation between crop yield and soil salinity

The third degree or cubic regression also offers a useful alternative.

The equation reads:

$$Y=AX^3+BX^2+CX+D$$

with Y the yield, X the salt concentration of the soil, while A, B, C and D are constants to be determined by the regression.

In the figure: A = 0.0017, B = 0.0604, C=0.3874, D = 2.3788. These values were calculated with Microsoft Excel

The curvature is more pronounced than in the other models.

== See also ==
- Maas–Hoffman model
