= Eragrostis condensata =

Conservation status
- Least Concern (IUCN 3.1)

Scientific classification
- Kingdom: Plantae
- Clade: Embryophytes
- Clade: Tracheophytes
- Clade: Spermatophytes
- Clade: Angiosperms
- Clade: Monocots
- Clade: Commelinids
- Order: Poales
- Family: Poaceae
- Subfamily: Chloridoideae
- Genus: Eragrostis
- Species: E. condensata

Binomial name
- Eragrostis condensata (J. Presl) Steud.

Species of grass

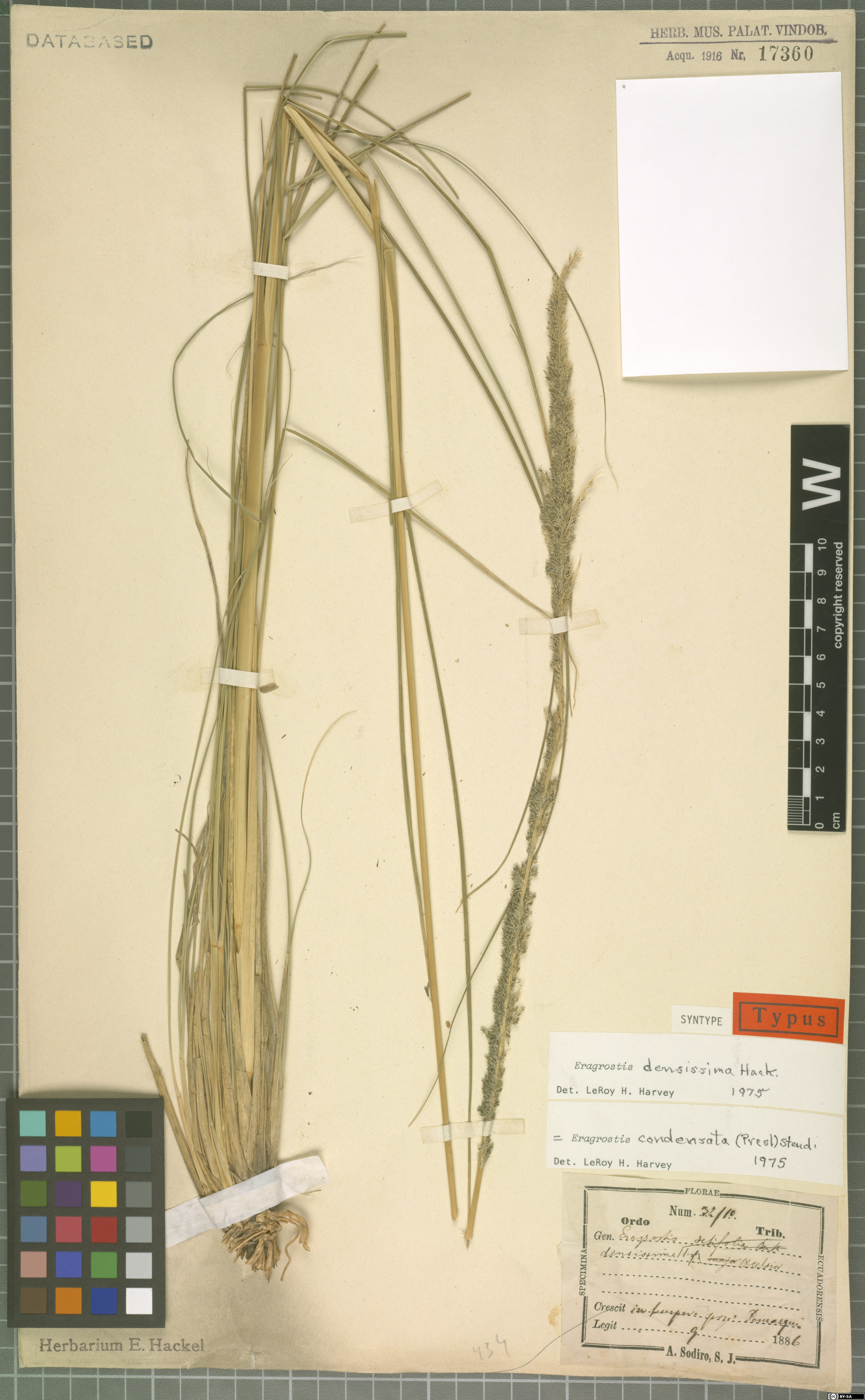
Eragrostis condensata

Eragrostis condensata is a species of grass that is endemic to Ecuador.
