= Arabidopsis thaliana responses to salinity =

As a model organism, the Arabidopsis thaliana response to salinity is studied to aid understanding of other more economically important crops.

High concentration of salt in the soil has negative effects on plants. For example, it reduces the yield that crop plants can produce in 7% of the land. On the other side, some plants show adaptations to changes in soil salinity, in that the plant's exposure to salt initiates certain mechanisms for cell osmotic regulation and causes changes in this plant's water obtaining and loss behaviors. One of such plants is the model plant Arabidopsis thaliana, a member of the family Brassicaceae. Arabidopsis thaliana is native to Eurasia and was introduced to some parts of North America. It grows in rocky, sandy and disturbed terrains. It has been found in many studies that Arabidopsis thaliana showed enhanced Na^{+} and H^{+} extrusion from their cells after exposure to high salinity. Part of Arabidopsis’ range might have included high salinity soil and the plant started adapting to that.

Upon high salt exposure, Arabidopsis experiences a negative osmotic pressure gradient between the salty solution and its xylem, and it absorbs Na^{+} through Na^{+} permeable transporters. The plant then reduces the impact of high Na+ abundance by improving Na+ efflux from its cells through SOS pathway Two different paths in the SOS pathway can activate SOS1, a molecule that causes sodium efflux. One path is the SOS2-SOS3, the other is the PLD path. This is shown in figure 1. SOS2-SOS3 path:

1. After exposure to high sodium level, calcium level increases in the cytosol. SOS3 can detect elevated calcium by making a calcium-binding protein, a protein that detects high calcium level in the cytosol and binds to it.
2. SOS3 proteins interact with protein kinases, then get phosphorylated, which builds up the complex SOS2-SOS3 attached to calcium, then activates SOS2
3. Activation of SOS2 pushes it to the plasma membrane, then activates SOS1. Finally, this causes the extrusion of any extra Sodium to the outside through Na^{+}/H^{+} antiporter which is near SOS1.
4. The SOS2-SOS3 complex is necessary for generating the full response of SOS1. But in mutants missing SOS2-SOS3, Sodium can directly regulate SOS1.

== (PLD) path ==
High salinity increases the activity of the enzyme PLD1, which causes the accumulation of phosphatidic acid. PA activates MPK6, a protein kinase regulating translation efficiency in high salinity conditions. Then MPK6 phosphorylates SOS1 and again causes sodium efflux.

One of the experiments providing the previous pathway utilized Arabidopsis seedlings grown inside X-gal dishes. Researchers used 6–8 days old plants. The MIFE technique was employed to assess the magnitudes of fluxes of Na^{+}, K^{+}, and H^{+}. The experiment involved cutting 8–10 mm long root segments and placing them in a Perspex holder. Then they put the holder inside a 4 mL chamber containing the required solution. They gave around 50 minutes for that setting to reach equilibrium, then took the measurements. Through such a technique, they measured net ion fluxes.

Looking at plants responses to salinity might help us distinguish the plants that show the best responses, that is plants that show the least negative impacts on their fitness upon salinity exposure. This might open up the possibility of planting them into soils that other plants cannot survive in.
