= Halotolerance =

Adaptation of living organisms to conditions of high salinity

Halotolerance is the ability of organisms to live in salt concentrations beyond which is necessary for their growth. Halotolerant species are found in saline waters and soils. Halotolerant microorganisms include bacteria, archaea, and fungi. Halophilic microorganisms require salt to grow; halotolerant organisms may be classified as some degree halophilic, but are often contrasted from halophiles because halotolerant organisms do not require a high-salinity environment. Halotolerant microorganisms are of considerable biotechnological interest as their roles in saline ecosystems remains unknown.

== Applications ==
Fields of scientific research relevant to halotolerance include biochemistry, molecular biology, cell biology, physiology, ecology, and genetics.

Studying the mechanisms of halotolerance in microorganisms can be applied to organism growth and ecosystem dynamics in increasingly saline environments. Halotolerance can be applied to pollution and climate change; processes of halotolerance may be implemented to limit the damages of pollution.

Some halotolerant microorganisms are able to use light energy to generate proton and chloride gradients which allows bioenergetic processes to occur. The light-transducing protein, bacteriorhodopsin, allows this pathway to occur and has applications in holography, artificial retina, neutral network optical computing, and other technical methods.

Halotolerant microorganisms may be utilized as bioremidators in contaminated soils and in waste water. Certain halotolerant organisms are able to produce biosurfactants in saline environments polluted by hydrocarbons where other organisms may be unable to survive and produce biosurfactants. Halotlerant bacteria effectively remediate saline soil by lowering the Na contents and sodium absorption ratios in soil and by degrading toxic compounds.

Fermentation processes in food that use salt can utilize halotolerant organisms. Lactobacillus pantarum is used in the production of pickles and sauerkraut, and other halotolerant bacteria are used in the production fish sauce and soy sauces.

Goals of studying halotolerance include increasing the agricultural productivity of lands affected by soil salination or where only saline water is available. Salinity limits crop productivity and growth, so conventional agricultural species could be made more halotolerant by gene transfer from naturally halotolerant species (by conventional breeding or genetic engineering) or by applying treatments developed from an understanding of the mechanisms halotolerance.

Environment stressors like drought and extreme temperatures can involve or induce osmotic changes, so applying knowledge of halotolerance is relevant to environments with extremes in moisture or temperature.

Bioactive metabolites of halotolerant organisms may limit the growth of cancer, especially lung and breast cancer, and may have applications in chemotherapy resistance and treatment-related toxicity.

== Cellular functions of halotolerant organisms ==
Tolerance of high salt conditions occurs through several physiological mechanisms. High concentrations of salt in soil or water that plants live in can trigger ionic imbalances which cause complications in respiration and photosynthesis, leading to reduced rates of growth, injury and death in severe cases. To be considered tolerant of saline conditions, the protoplast must show methods of balancing the toxic and osmotic effects of the increased salt concentrations.

Halotolerant organisms must cope with the stress of changing and high salinity; osmotic stress and ionic stress is put on cells in high salinity. An environment of high salinity leads to loss of water in the cell, so halotolerant organisms have developed mechanisms to retain water and sequester salt within the cell. Halotolerant organisms may utilize a combination of mechanisms to tolerate high salinity environments.

Halotolerant organisms maintain osmotic balance by producing or accumulating osmoprotectants. This mechanism allows the cell to retain water in conditions of high salinity by maintaining water uptake without disrupting metabolic cellular processes. In response to high salinity, the rate of transcription of genes for compatible solutes is increased.

In many halotolerant organisms high levels of salt are absorbed by cells to maintain an osmotic potential lower than that of the environment to ensure water uptake. A mechanism of tolerating excessive salt in halotolerant organisms is the sequestration of salt into a vacuole. This keeps the concentration of salt in the cell's cytoplasm low so that the metabolic activities of the cell can continue.

In some organisms, flagellum-related genes are down-regulated in environments with high concentrations of salt which conserves energy of motion to be used in osmoprotection.

== Bacterial halotolerance ==
The extent of halotolerance varies widely amongst different species of bacteria. A number of cyanobacteria are halotolerant, such as the cyanobacteria of Makgadikgadi Pans, a large hypersaline lake in Botswana. Cyanobacteria possess a high level of physiological flexibility; recent research on the mechanisms of halotolerance in cyanobacteria using omics approaches aim to identify the gene networks and biochemical pathways of halotolerance like those that produce osmoprotectants.

== Fungal halotolerance ==
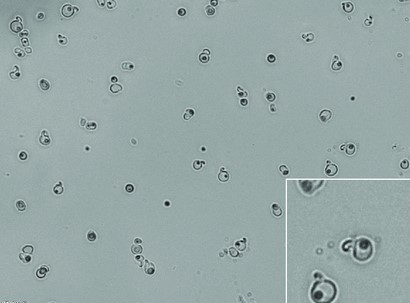
Debaryomyces hansenii

Before the 2000s, it was commonly believed that fungi did not inhabit extremely saline environments, but research has disproved the idea by finding fungi in solar salterns. Fungi from habitats with high concentration of salt are mostly halotolerant, few are halophilic. Halotolerant fungi constitute a relatively large and constant part of hypersaline environment communities, such as those in the solar salterns. Well studied examples include the yeast Debaryomyces hansenii and black yeasts Aureobasidium pullulans and Hortaea werneckii which can grow in hyper saline conditions, making them model organisms to study halotolerance. The latter can grow in media without salt, as well as in almost saturated NaCl solutions. To emphasize this unusually wide adaptability, some authors describe H. werneckii as "extremely halotolerant".

Mechanisms of halotolerance in fungi include regulating intracellular ion concentrations and accumulating osmoprotectants to maintain osmotic balance without toxicity or disrupting cellular metabolic activity.

== See also ==
- Arabidopsis thaliana responses to salinity
- Biosalinity – Use of salty water for irrigation
- Crop tolerance to seawater – Quality in crops
- Salinity control – Controlling the problem of soil salinity
- Salt tolerance of crops
- Sodium in biology
- Soil salinity – Salt content in the soil
- Soil salinity control – Controlling the problem of soil salinity
