= Halophyte =

Salt-tolerant plant

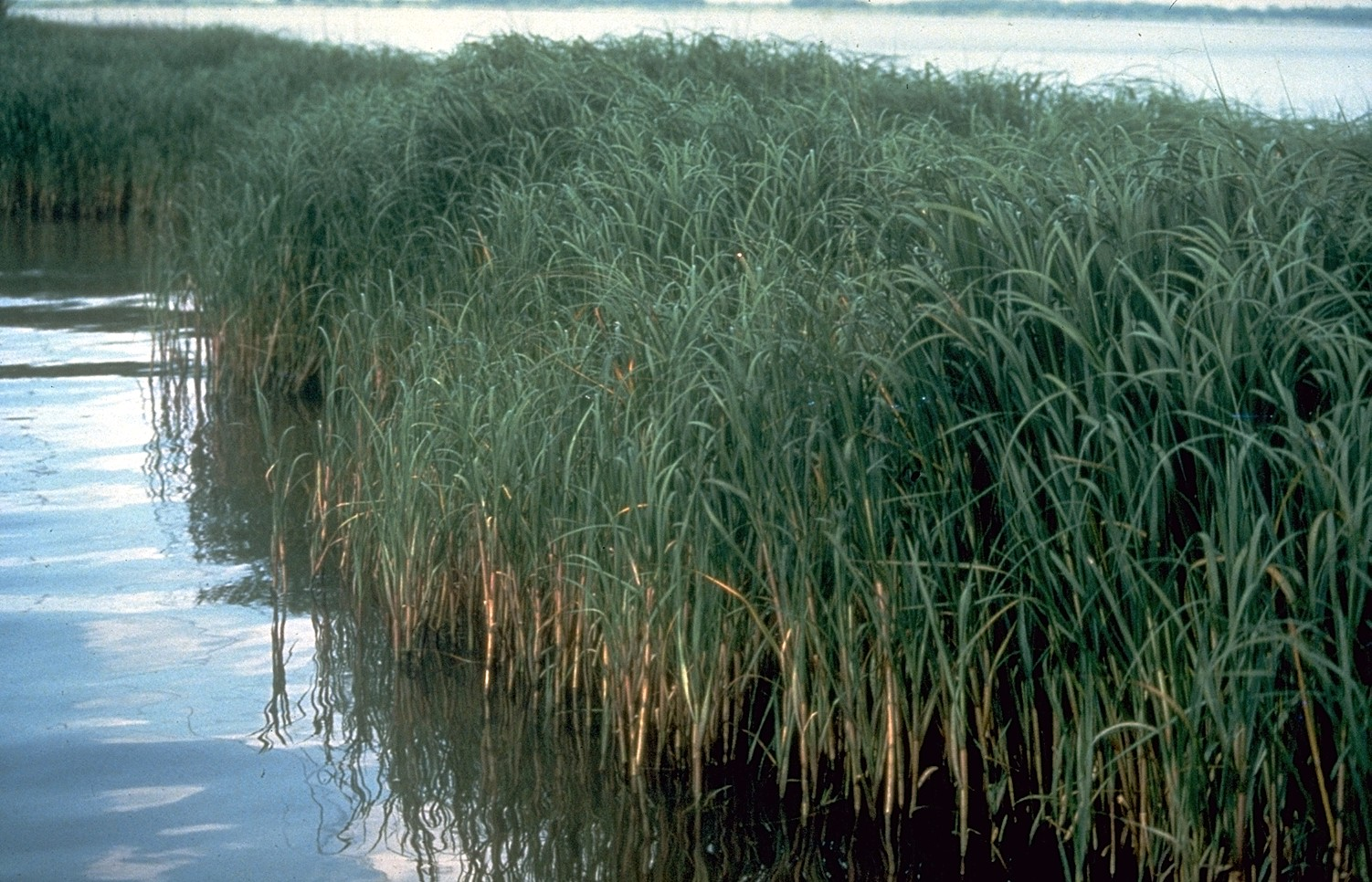
Spartina alterniflora (cordgrass), a halophyte.

A halophyte is a salt-tolerant plant that grows in soil or waters of high salinity, coming into contact with saline water through its roots or by salt spray, such as in saline semi-deserts, mangrove swamps, marshes and sloughs, and seashores. The word derives from Ancient Greek ἅλας (halas) 'salt' and φυτόν (phyton) 'plant'. Halophytes have different anatomy, physiology and biochemistry than glycophytes. An example of a halophyte is the salt marsh grass Spartina alterniflora (smooth cordgrass). Relatively few plant species are halophytes—perhaps only 2% of all plant species.

The large majority of plant species are glycophytes, which are not salt-tolerant and are damaged fairly easily by high salinity.

== Classification ==
Halophytes can be classified in many ways. According to Stocker (1933), it is mainly of 3 kinds by habitat, viz.

1. Aqua-halines (aquatic plants)
  - Emerged Halophytes (most of the stem remains above the water level)
  - Hydro-halophytes (whole or almost whole plant remains under water)
2. Terrestro-halines (terrestrial plants)
  - Hygro-halophytes (grow on swamp lands)
  - Mesohalophytes (grow on non-swamp, non-dry lands)
  - Xero-halophytes (grow on dry or mostly dry lands)
3. Aero-halines (epiphytes and aerophytes)

Again, according to Iversen (1936), these plants are classified with respect to the salinity of the soil on which they grow.

1. Oligo-halophytes (amount of NaCl in the soil is 0.01 to 0.1%)
2. Meso-halophytes (amount of NaCl in the soil is 0.1 to 1%)
3. Euhalophytes (amount of NaCl in the soil is >1%)

For comparison, seawater has a salinity of about 3.5%. See water salinity for other reference levels.

== Habitats of halophytes ==
Major habitats where halophytes flourish include mangrove swamps, sand and cliff shorelines in the tropics, salt deserts and semi-deserts, the Sargasso Sea, mudflats and salt marshes, kelp forests and beds, salt lakes and salt steppes of the Pannonian region, wash fringes, isolated inland saline grasslands, and in places where people have brought about salination.

== Salt tolerance ==
True halophytes do not just tolerate saline water, but show optimal growth in saline water.

One quantitative measure of salt tolerance (halotolerance) is the total dissolved solids in irrigation water that a plant can tolerate. Seawater typically contains 40 grams per litre (g/L) of dissolved salts (mostly sodium chloride). Beans and rice can tolerate about 1–3 g/L, and are considered glycophytes (as are most crop plants). At the other extreme, Salicornia bigelovii (dwarf glasswort) grows well at 70 g/L of dissolved solids, and is a promising halophyte for use as a crop. Plants such as barley (Hordeum vulgare) and the date palm (Phoenix dactylifera) can tolerate about 5 g/L, and can be considered as marginal halophytes.

Adaptation to saline environments by halophytes may take the form of salt tolerance or salt avoidance. Plants that avoid the effects of high salt even though they live in a saline environment may be referred to as facultative halophytes rather than 'true', or obligatory, halophytes.

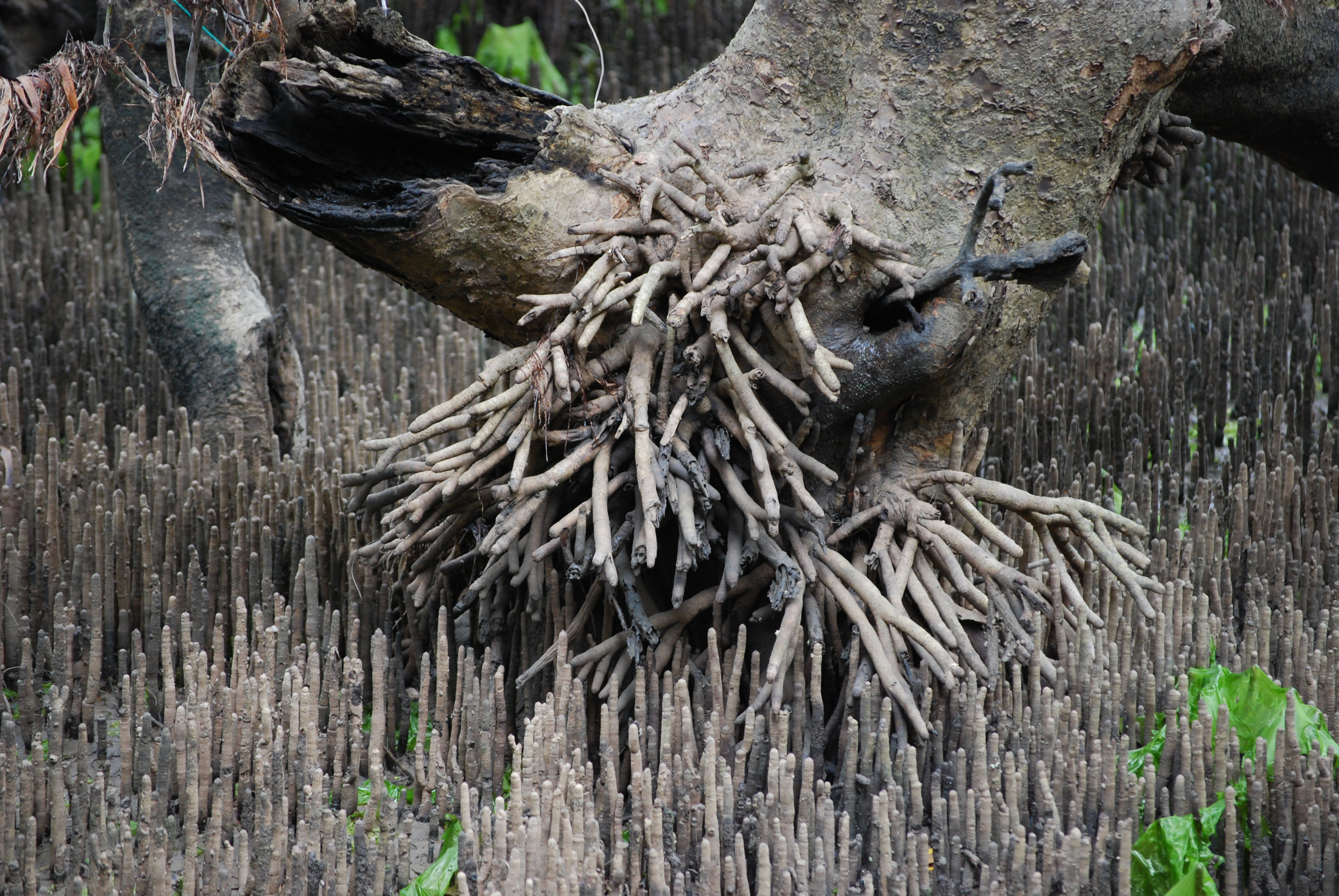
Pneumatophores of grey mangrove

For example, a short-lived plant species that completes its reproductive life cycle during periods (such as a rainy season) when the salt concentration is low would be avoiding salt rather than tolerating it. Or a plant species may maintain a 'normal' internal salt concentration by excreting excess salts through its leaves, by way of salt glands, or by concentrating salts in salt bladders in leaves that later die and drop off.

In an effort to improve agricultural production in regions where crops are exposed to salinity, research is focused on improving understanding of the various mechanisms whereby plants respond to salinity stress, so that more robust crop halophytes may be developed. Adaptive responses to salinity stress have been identified at molecular, cellular, metabolic, and physiological levels.

== Examples ==
Some halophytes are:

| Taxon | Common name(s) | Habitat type | Tolerance type |
|---|---|---|---|
| Anemopsis californica | yerba mansa, lizard tail | Hygro | |
| Atriplex | saltbush, orache, orach | Xero | |
| Attalea speciosa | babassu | Meso | |
| Dunaliella | (a green alga) | Hydro | Eu (seawater) |
| Halimione portulacoides | sea purslane | Hygro | Eu (seawater) |
| Panicum virgatum | switchgrass | Meso, Xero | |
| Salicornia bigelovii | dwarf glasswort, pickleweed | Hygro | Eu (seawater) |
| Salicornia fruticosa | saltworts | ? | |
| Sesuvium portulacastrum | sea purslane, shoreline purslane | Hygro | Eu (seawater) |
| Sporobolus alterniflorus | smooth cordgrass | Emerged, Hygro | Eu (seawater) |
| Suaeda | Seep-weeds | Hygro | Eu (seawater) |
| Tetragonia tetragonioides | warrigal greens, kōkihi, sea spinach | Hygro | Eu (seawater) |

== Uses ==
=== Biofuel ===
Some halophytes are being studied for use as "3rd-generation" biofuel precursors. Halophytes such as Salicornia bigelovii can be grown in harsh environments and typically do not compete with food crops for resources, making them promising sources of biodiesel or bioalcohol.

=== Phytoremediation ===
Halophytes like Suaeda salsa can store salt ions and rare-earth elements absorbed from soils in their tissues. Halophytes can therefore be used in Phytoremediation measures to adjust salinity levels of surrounding soils. These measures aim to allow glycophytes to survive in previously uninhabitable areas through an environmentally safe, and cost effective process. A higher concentration of halophyte plants in one area leads to higher salt uptake and lower soil salinity levels.

Different species of halophytes have different absorption capabilities. Three different halophyte species (Atriplex patula, Atriplex hortensis, and Atriplex canescans) have been found to rehabilitate soils contaminated with road salt over varying lengths of time.

== See also ==
- Biosalinity – Use of salty water for irrigation
- Crop tolerance to seawater – Quality in crops
- Halotolerance – Adaptation of living organisms to conditions of high salinity
- Salt tolerance of crops
- Sodium in biology – Use of sodium by organisms
- Soil salinity – Salt content in the soil
- Soil salinity control – Controlling the problem of soil salinity
