= Leech (disambiguation) =

Leeches are segmented parasitic or predatory Annelid worms.

Leech may also refer to:

== Film and television ==
- The Leech (1921 film)
- The Leech (1956 film)
- Leeches!, a 2003 film
- Leech (Masters of the Universe), a character from He-Man and the Masters of the Universe
- "Leech", an episode of Smallville

== Music ==
- "Leech" (song), a 2008 song by the Gazette
- "Leech", a song by Bleed from Within from their album Uprising
- "Leech", a song by Bullet for My Valentine from their album Temper Temper
- "Leech", a song by The Haunted from their album Made Me Do It
- "Leech", a song by Miss May I from their album At Heart
- "Leech", a song by Northlane from their album Node
- "Leech", a song by Soilwork from their album The Living Infinite
- "Leech", a song by Sylosis from their album Dormant Heart
- "Leeches", a song by Melanie Martinez from album Portals

== Places in the United States ==
- Leech Creek, a stream in Wisconsin
- Leech Lake, in Cass County, Minnesota
- Leech Lake (Chisago County, Minnesota)

== Science and technology ==
- Leeching (medical), a form of bloodletting in medieval and early-modern medicine which used leeches
- Leech (computing), someone who uses others' information or effort but does not provide any in return

== Other uses ==
- Leech (character), a fictional Morlock in Marvel Comics
- Leech (sail), the aft edge of a sail
- Leech (surname)

== See also ==
- Leach (disambiguation)
- Leaching (disambiguation)
- Leash (disambiguation)
- Leech lattice, a lattice Λ in R^{24}, discovered by John Leech
- Leeching (disambiguation)
