= Environmental impact of irrigation =

Land & irrigation

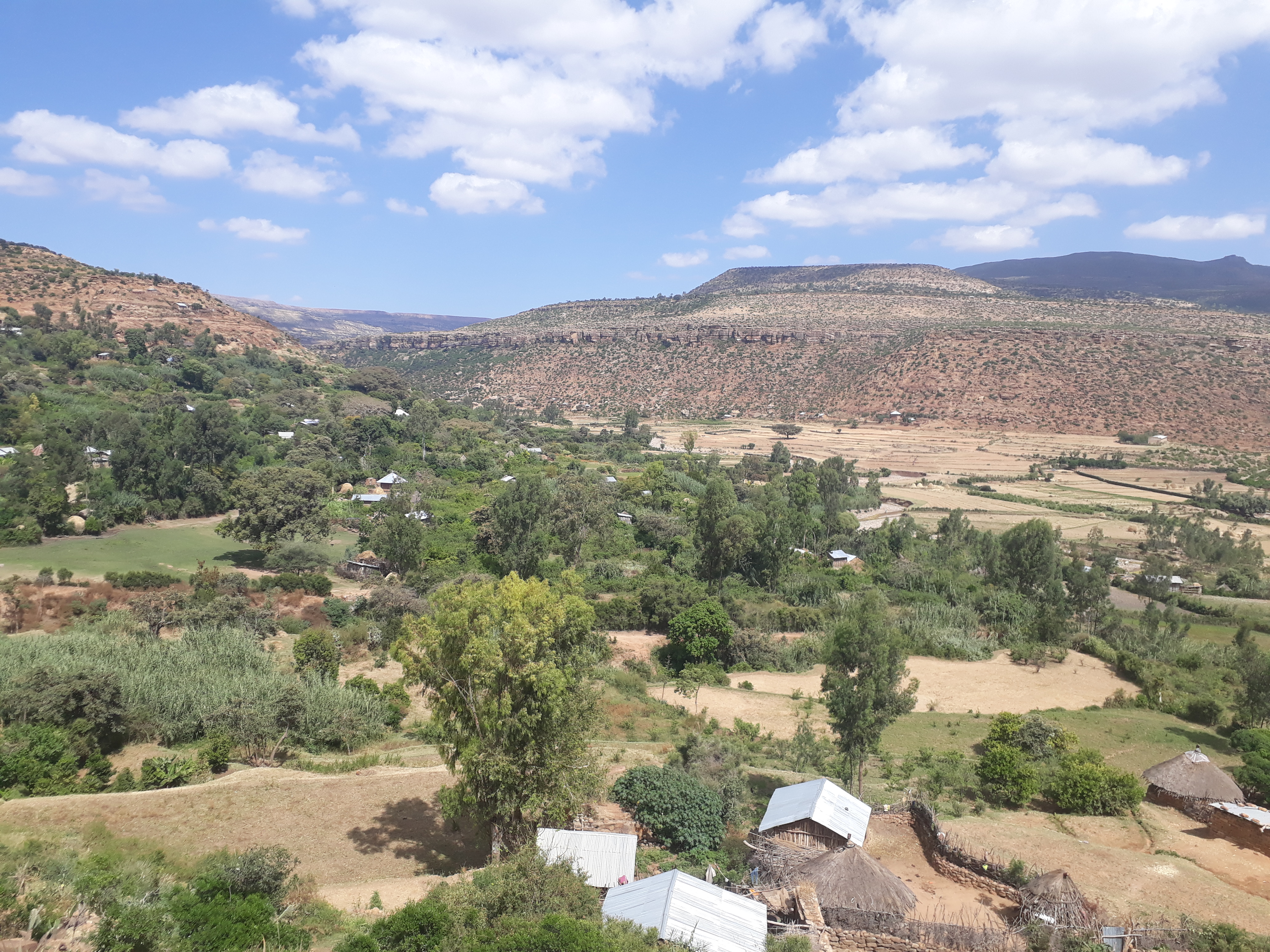
The first environmental effect is increased crop growth, such as in the Rubaksa gardens in Ethiopia.

The irrigation that grows crops, especially in dry countries, can also be responsible for taxing aquifers beyond their capacities. Groundwater depletion is embedded in the international food trade, with countries exporting crops grown from overexploited aquifers and setting up potential future food crises if the aquifers run dry.

The environmental impact of irrigation relates to the changes in quantity and quality of soil and water as a result of irrigation and the subsequent effects on natural and social conditions in river basins and downstream of an irrigation scheme. The effects stem from the altered hydrological conditions caused by the installation and operation of the irrigation scheme.

Amongst some of these problems is the depletion of underground aquifers through overdrafting. Soil can be over-irrigated due to poor distribution uniformity or management wastes water, chemicals, and may lead to water pollution. Over-irrigation can cause deep drainage from rising water tables that can lead to problems of irrigation salinity requiring watertable control by some form of subsurface land drainage. However, if the soil is under-irrigated, it gives poor soil salinity control, which leads to increased soil salinity with the consequent buildup of toxic salts on the soil surface in areas with high evaporation. This requires either leaching to remove these salts or a method of drainage to carry the salts away. Irrigation with saline or high-sodium water may damage soil structure owing to the formation of alkaline soil.

== Direct effects ==
Countries with the highest share of water withdrawal by agriculture in total withdrawal

An irrigation scheme draws water from groundwater, rivers, lakes, or overland flow, and distributes it over a certain area. Hydrological, or direct, effects of doing this include reduction in downstream river flow, increased evaporation in the irrigated area, increased level in the water table as groundwater recharge in the area is increased and flow increased in the irrigated area.

Likewise, irrigation has immediate effects on providing moisture to the atmosphere, inducing atmospheric instabilities, and increasing rainfall downwind, or in other cases modifies the atmospheric circulation, delivering rain to different downwind areas. Increases or decreases in irrigation are a key area of concern in precipitationshed studies, that examine how significant modifications to the delivery of evaporation to the atmosphere can alter downwind rainfall.

== Indirect effects ==
Indirect effects are those that have consequences that take longer to develop and may also be longer-lasting. The indirect effects of irrigation include the following:

- Waterlogging
- Soil salination
- Ecological damage
- Socioeconomic impacts

The indirect effects of waterlogging and soil salination occur directly on the land being irrigated. The ecological and socioeconomic consequences take longer to happen but can be more far-reaching.

Some irrigation schemes use water wells for irrigation. As a result, the overall water level decreases. This may cause water mining, land/soil subsidence, and, along the coast, saltwater intrusion.

Irrigated land area worldwide occupies about 16% of the total agricultural area, and the crop yield of irrigated land is roughly 40% of the total yield. In other words, irrigated land produces 2.5 times more product than non-irrigated land.

== Adverse impacts ==
=== Reduced river flow ===
The reduced downstream river flow may cause:

- reduced downstream flooding
- disappearance of ecologically and economically important wetlands or flood forests.
- reduced availability of industrial, municipal, household, and drinking water
- reduced shipping routes. Water withdrawal poses a serious threat to the Ganges. In India, barrages control all of the tributaries to the Ganges and divert roughly 60 percent of river flow to irrigation.
- reduced fishing opportunities. The Indus River in Pakistan faces scarcity due to the over-extraction of water for agriculture. The Indus is inhabited by 25 amphibian species and 147 fish species, of which 22 are found nowhere else. It harbors the endangered Indus river dolphin, one of the world's rarest mammals. Fish populations, the main source of protein and overall life support systems for many communities are also being threatened.
- reduced discharge into the sea, which may have various consequences like coastal erosion (e.g. in Ghana) and saltwater intrusion in delta's and estuaries (e.g. in Egypt, see Aswan Dam). Current water withdrawal from the river Nile for irrigation is so high that, despite its size, the river does not reach the sea in dry periods. The Aral Sea has suffered an "environmental catastrophe" due to the interception of river water for irrigation purposes.

=== Increased groundwater recharge, waterlogging, soil salinity ===
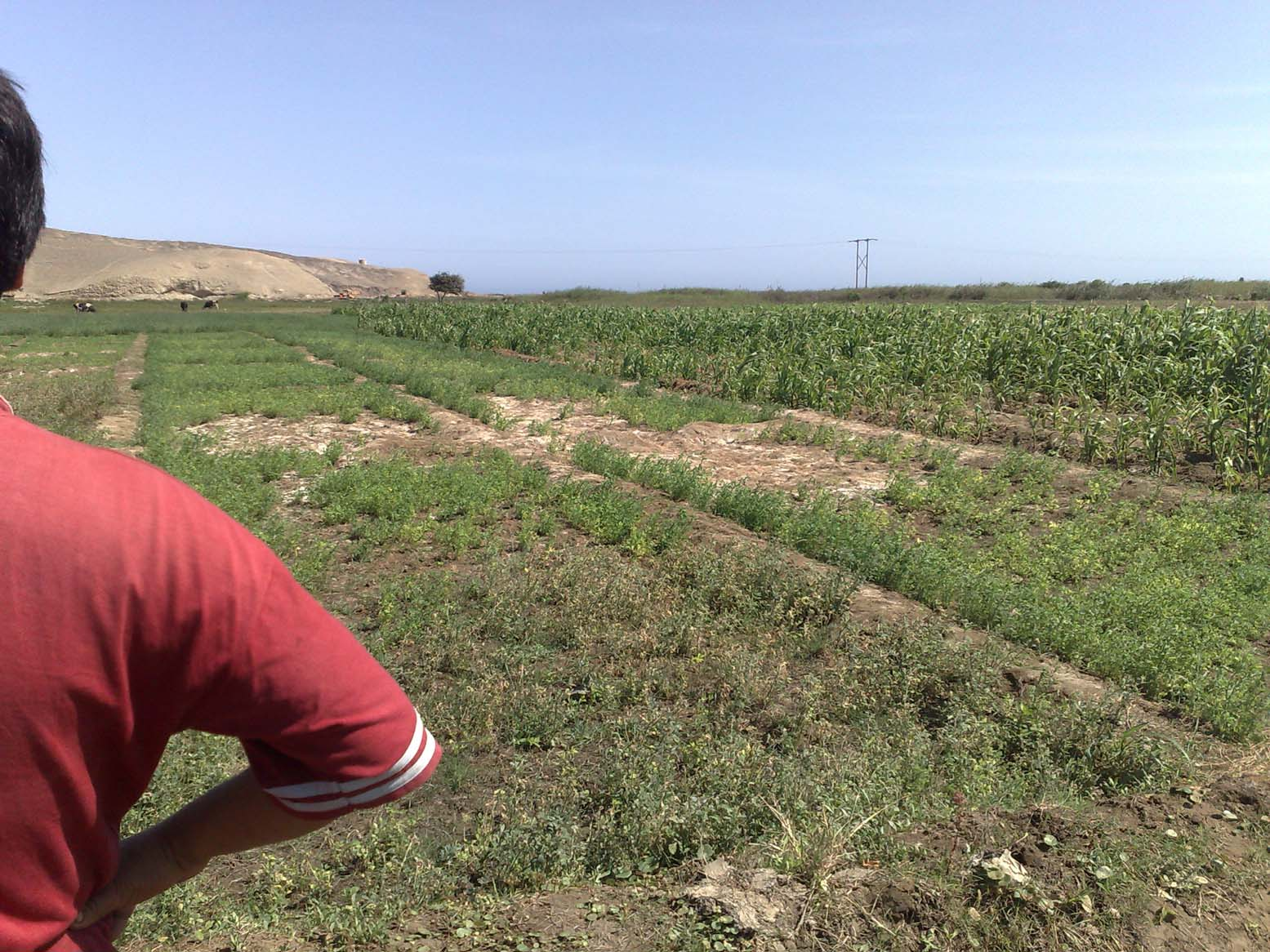
Looking over the shoulder of a Peruvian farmer in the Huarmey delta at waterlogged and salinised irrigated land with a poor crop stand. This illustrates an environmental impact of upstream irrigation developments causing an increased flow of groundwater to this lower-lying area, leading to adverse conditions.

Within a long period of groundwater depletion in California's Central Valley, short periods of recovery have been mostly driven by extreme weather events that typically caused flooding and had negative social, environmental and economic consequences.

Increased groundwater recharge stems from the unavoidable deep percolation losses in the irrigation scheme. The lower the irrigation efficiency, the higher the losses. Although reasonably high irrigation efficiencies of 70% or more (i.e., losses of 30% or less) can occur with sophisticated techniques like sprinkler irrigation and drip irrigation or by well-managed surface irrigation, in practice the losses are commonly in the order of 40% to 60%. This may cause the following issues:

- rising water tables
- increased storage of groundwater that may be used for irrigation, municipal, household, and drinking water by pumping from wells
- waterlogging and drainage problems in villages, agricultural lands, and along roads - with mostly negative consequences. The increased level of the water table can lead to reduced agricultural production.
- shallow water tables - a sign that the aquifer is unable to cope with the groundwater recharge stemming from the deep percolation losses
- where water tables are shallow, the irrigation applications are reduced. As a result, the soil is no longer leached and soil salinity problems develop
- stagnant water tables at the soil surface are known to increase the incidence of water-borne diseases like malaria, filariasis, yellow fever, dengue, and schistosomiasis (Bilharzia) in many areas. Health costs, appraisals of health impacts, and mitigation measures are rarely part of irrigation projects.
- to mitigate the adverse effects of shallow water tables and soil salinization, some form of watertable control, soil salinity control, drainage and drainage system is needed
- as drainage water moves through the soil profile, it may dissolve nutrients (either fertilizer-based or naturally occurring) such as nitrates, leading to a buildup of those nutrients in the ground-water aquifer. High nitrate levels in drinking water can be harmful to humans, particularly infants under six months, where it is linked to "blue-baby syndrome" (see Methemoglobinemia).

=== Reduced downstream river water quality ===
Owing to drainage of surface and groundwater in the project area, which waters may be salinized and polluted by agricultural chemicals like biocides and fertilizers, the quality of the river water below the project area can deteriorate, which makes it less fit for industrial, municipal and household use. It may lead to reduced public health. Polluted river water entering the sea may adversely affect the ecology along the seashore (see Aswan Dam).

The detention of sediments behind the dams can eliminate the natural contribution of sediments, which is critical to surface water irrigation diversions. Sedimentation is an essential part of the ecosystem that requires the natural flux of the river flow. This natural cycle of sediment dispersion replenishes the nutrients in the soil, which will, in turn, determine the livelihood of the plants and animals that rely on the sediments carried downstream. The benefits of heavy sedimentation deposits can be seen in large rivers like the Nile River. The sediment from the delta has built up to form a giant aquifer during flood season and retains water in the wetlands. The wetlands created and sustained due to built-up sediment are a habitat for numerous species of birds. However, heavy sedimentation can reduce downstream river water quality and can exacerbate floods upstream. This has been known to happen in the Sanmenxia reservoir in China. The Sanmenxia reservoir is part of a larger man-made project of hydroelectric dams called the Three Gorge Project.

In 1998, uncertain calculations and heavy sediment greatly affected the reservoir's ability to fulfill its flood-control function properly. This also reduces the downstream river water quality. Shifting more towards mass irrigation installments to meet more socioeconomic demands is going against the natural balance of nature, and use water pragmatically- use it where it is found.

=== Affected downstream water users ===
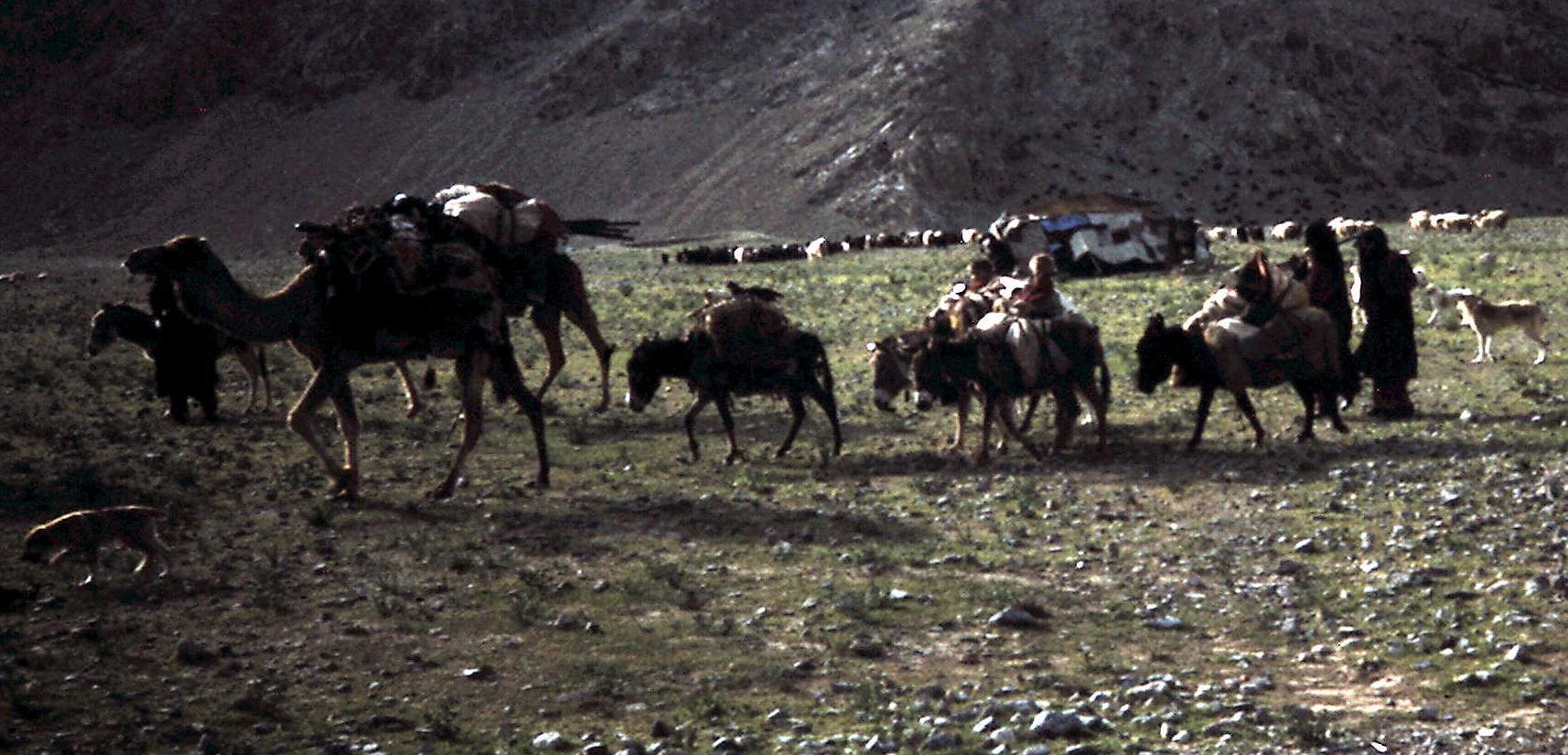
Water becomes scarce for nomadic pastoralist in Baluchistan due to new irrigation developments.

Downstream water users often have no legal water rights and may fall victim to irrigation development.

Pastoralists and nomadic tribes may find their land and water resources blocked by new irrigation developments without having legal recourse.

Flood-recession cropping may be seriously affected by the upstream interception of river water for irrigation purposes.

- In Baluchistan, Pakistan, the development of new small-scale irrigation projects depleted the water resources of nomadic tribes traveling annually between Baluchistan and Gujarat or Rajasthan, India
- After the closure of the Kainji dam, Nigeria, 50 to 70 percent of the downstream area of flood-recession cropping was lost.

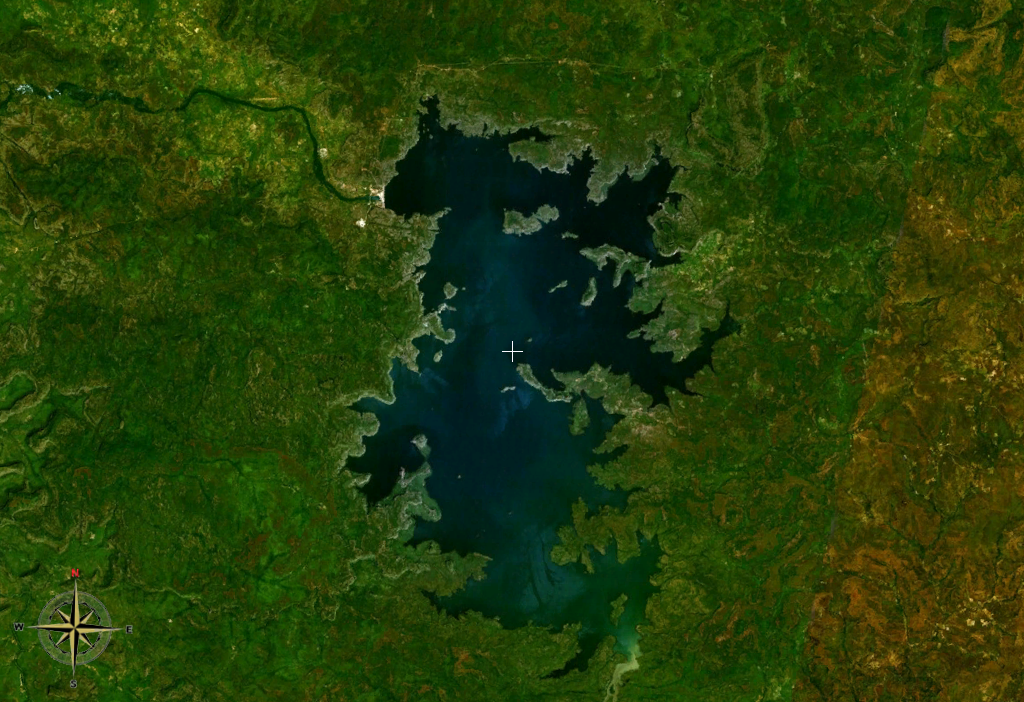
Lake Manantali, 477 km^{2}, displaced 12,000 people.

=== Lost land use opportunities ===
Irrigation projects may reduce the fishing opportunities of the original population and the grazing opportunities for cattle. The livestock pressure on the remaining lands may increase considerably because the ousted traditional pastoralist tribes will have to find their subsistence and existence elsewhere, overgrazing may increase, followed by serious soil erosion and the loss of natural resources.

The Manatali reservoir formed by the Manantali Dam in Mali intersects the migration routes of nomadic pastoralists and destroyed 43000 ha of savannah, probably leading to overgrazing and erosion elsewhere. Further, the reservoir destroyed 120 km^{2} of forest. The depletion of groundwater aquifers, which is caused by the suppression of the seasonal flood cycle, is damaging the forests downstream of the dam.

=== Groundwater mining with wells, land subsidence ===
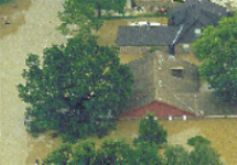
Flooding as a consequence of land subsidence.

When more groundwater is pumped from wells than replenished, storage of water in the aquifer is being mined, and the use of that water is no longer sustainable. As levels fail, it becomes more difficult to extract water, and pumps will struggle to maintain the design flow rate, which may consume more energy per unit of water. Eventually, extracting groundwater may become so difficult that farmers may be forced to abandon irrigated agriculture.
Some notable examples include:

- The hundreds of tube wells installed in Uttar Pradesh, India, with World Bank funding, have operating periods of 1.4 to 4.7 hours/day. In contrast, they were designed to operate 16 hours/day.
- In Baluchistan, Pakistan, the development of tube well irrigation projects was at the expense of the traditional qanat or karez users.
- groundwater-related subsidence of the land due to mining of groundwater occurred in the United States at a rate of 1m for every 13m that the water table was lowered.
- Homes at Greens Bayou near Houston, Texas, where 5 to 7 feet of subsidence has occurred, were flooded during a storm in June 1989 as shown in the picture.

== Simulation and prediction ==
The effects of irrigation on the water table, soil salinity, and salinity of drainage and groundwater, and the effects of mitigative measures can be simulated and predicted using agro-hydro-salinity models like SaltMod and SahysMod.

=== Case studies ===
1. In India, 2.19 million ha of land has been reported to suffer from waterlogging in irrigation canal commands. Also, 3.47 million ha were reported to be seriously salt-affected.
2. In the Indus Plains in Pakistan, more than 2 million hectares of land are waterlogged. The soil of 13.6 million hectares within the Gross Command Area was surveyed, which revealed that 3.1 million hectares (23%) were saline. 23% of this was in Sindh and 13% in the Punjab. More than 3 million ha of water-logged lands have been provided with tube-wells and drains at the cost of billions of rupees. Still, the reclamation objectives were only partially achieved. The Asian Development Bank (ADB) states that 38% of the irrigated area is now waterlogged and 14% of the surface is too saline for use.
3. In the Nile Delta of Egypt, drainage is being installed in millions of hectares to combat the water-logging resulting from the introduction of massive perennial irrigation after the completion of the High Dam at Assuan.
4. In Mexico, 15% of the 3 million ha of irrigable land is salinized, and 10% is waterlogged.
5. In Peru some 0.3 million ha of the 1.05 million ha of irrigable land suffers from degradation (see Irrigation in Peru).
6. Estimates indicate that roughly one-third of the irrigated land in the major irrigation countries is already badly affected by salinity or is expected to become so in the near future. Present estimates for Israel are 13% of the irrigated land, Australia 20%, China 15%, Iraq 50%, Egypt 30%. Irrigation-induced salinity occurs in large and small irrigation systems alike.
7. FAO has estimated that by 1990 about 52 million ha of irrigated land will need to have improved drainage systems installed, much of it subsurface drainage to control salinity.

=== Reduced downstream drainage and groundwater quality ===
- The downstream drainage water quality may deteriorate owing to leaching of salts, nutrients, herbicides and pesticides with high salinity and alkalinity. There is the threat of soils converting into saline or alkali soils. This may negatively affect the health of the population at the tail-end of the river basin and downstream of the irrigation scheme, as well as the ecological balance. The Aral Sea, for example, is seriously polluted by drainage water.
- The downstream quality of the groundwater may deteriorate in a similar way as the downstream drainage water and have similar consequences

== Mitigation of adverse effects ==
Irrigation can have a variety of negative impacts on ecology and socioeconomy, which may be mitigated in a number of ways. These include siting the irrigation project in a location that minimizes negative impacts. The efficiency of existing projects can be improved and existing degraded croplands can be improved rather than establishing a new irrigation project.

Developing small-scale, individually owned irrigation systems as an alternative to large-scale, publicly owned and managed schemes. The use of sprinkler irrigation and micro-irrigation systems decreases the risk of waterlogging and erosion. Where practicable, using treated wastewater makes more water available to other users. Maintaining flood flows downstream of the dams can ensure that an adequate area is flooded each year, supporting, amongst other objectives, fishery activities.

=== Delayed environmental impacts ===
It often takes time to accurately predict the impact that new irrigation schemes will have on the ecology and socioeconomy of a region. By the time these predictions are available, a considerable amount of time and resources may have already been expended in the implementation of that project. When that is the case, the project managers will often only change the project if the impact would be considerably more than they had originally expected.

=== Case study in Malawi ===
Frequently irrigation schemes are seen as extremely necessary for socioeconomic well-being especially in developing countries.

One example of this can be demonstrated from a proposal for an irrigation scheme in Malawi. Here it was shown that the potential positive effects of the irrigation project that was being proposed "outweighed the potential negative impacts". It was stated that the impacts would mostly "be localized, minimal, a short term occurring during the construction and operation phases of the Project". In order to help alleviate and prevent major environmental impacts, they would use techniques that minimize the potential negative impacts. As far as the region's socioeconomic well-being, there would be no "displacement and/or resettlement envisioned during the implementation of the project activities". The original primary purposes of the irrigation project were to reduce poverty, improve food security, create local employment, increase household income and enhance the sustainability of land use.

Due to this careful planning, this project was successful both in improving the socioeconomic conditions in the region and ensuring that land and water are sustainable into the future.

== See also ==
- Environmental issues with agriculture
- Environmental impacts of reservoirs
- Alkali soils
- Irrigation in viticulture
- Routing (hydrology)
- Indian Council of Forestry Research and Education
