= Drainage model =

Drainage model may refer to:

- a surface drainage model or rainfall-runoff model; see surface runoff, runoff model (reservoir)
- a subsurface (groundwater), drainage model related to:
  - a spacing equation for subsurface pipe drains and open ditches (horizontal drainage) or wells (vertical drainage); see watertable control
  - a hydrological subsurface drainage model; see soil salinity control for an example of an agro-hydro-salinity subsurface drainage model (SaltMod)
  - groundwater flow in the aquifer; see groundwater model or an example of an agro-hydro-salinity groundwater model: SahysMod
