= Leach =

Leach may refer to:

== People ==
- Leach (surname)

== Places ==
- Leach, Oklahoma, United States, an unincorporated community and census-designated place
- Leach, Tennessee, United States, an unincorporated community
- Leach Range, a mountain range in Nevada, United States
- River Leach, England, United Kingdom
- Leach Nunatak, Marie Byrd Land, Antarctica
- Camp Leach, a World War I-era US Army camp

== Transportation ==
- Leach Highway, Western Australia
- Leach Airport, Colorado, United States
- Leach (automobile), an American luxury automobile manufacturer from 1919 to 1924
- Leach (steam automobile company), an American automobile manufacturer of the Leach steamer from 1899 to 1901

== Other uses ==
- Low-energy adaptive clustering hierarchy (LEACH), a routing protocol in wireless sensor networks
- "Leach", a song by Cryptopsy off their album The Unspoken King
- Leach (food), jelly-like sweetmeat popular in the 1600s
- Leach Pottery, Cornwell, UK
- Leach phenotype, a mutation in the gene encoding Glycophorin C

== See also ==
- Leach orchid
- Leach field, or septic drain field
- Leaching (disambiguation), and verb "to leach", various forms of loss or extraction of certain materials from a carrier into a liquid
- Leech (disambiguation)
