= Drainage research =

Study of agricultural drainage systems

Drainage research is the study of agricultural drainage systems and their effects to arrive at optimal system design.

== Overview ==
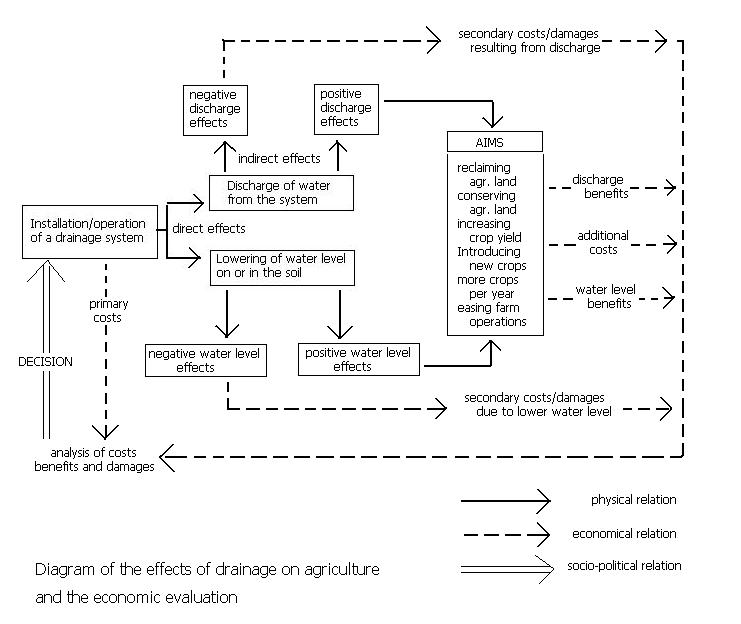
Figure 1.

Agricultural land drainage has agricultural, environmental, hydrological, engineering, economical, social and socio-political aspects (Figure 1). All these aspects can be subject of drainage research.

The aim (objective, target) of agricultural land drainage is the optimized agricultural production related to:

- reclamation of agricultural land
- conservation of agricultural land
- optimization of crop yield
- crop diversification
- cropping intensification
- optimization of farm operations

== Systems analysis ==
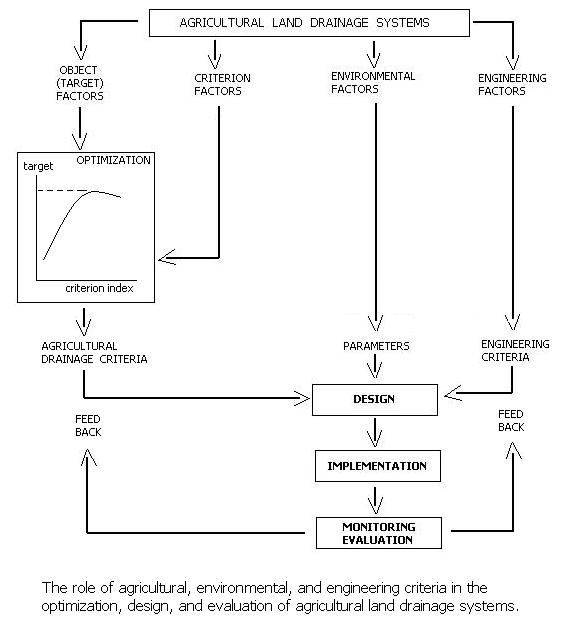
Figure 2.

The role of targets, criterion, environmental, and hydrological factors is illustrated in Figure 2. In this figure criterion factors are factors influenced by drainage on the one hand and the agricultural performance on the other.

An example of a criterion factor is the depth of the water table:

1. A drainage system influences this depth; the relation between drainage system design and depth of water table is mainly physical and can be described by drainage equations, in which the drainage requirements are to be found from a water balance.
2. The depth of the water table as a criterion factor needs to be translated into a criterion index to be given a numerical value that represents the behavior of the water table on the one hand and that can be related to the target (e.g. crop production) on the other hand.
3. The relation between criterion index and target can often be optimized, the maximum value providing the ultimate aim while the corresponding value of the criterion index can be used as an agricultural drainage criterion in the design procedure.

== Crop response processes ==
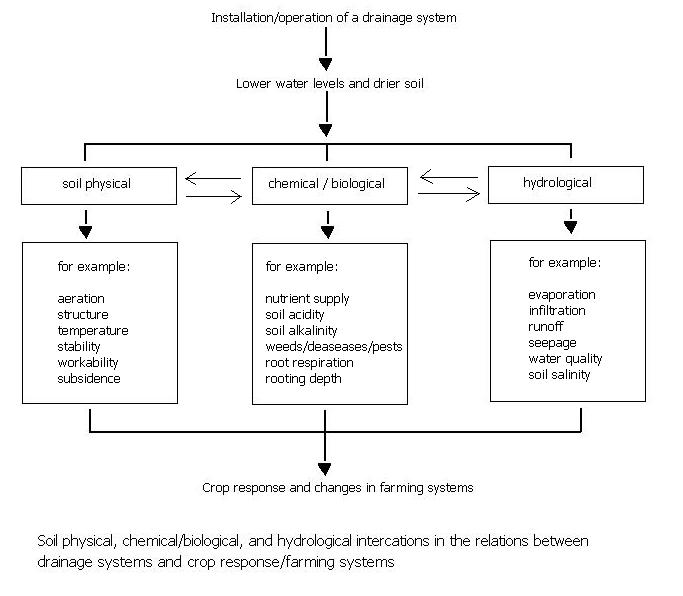
Figure 3.

The underlying processes in the optimization (as in the insert of Figure 2) are manifold. The processes can be grouped into mutually dependent soil physical, soil chemical/biological, and hydrological processes (Figure 3):

- The soil physical processes include soil aeration, soil structure, soil stability, and soil temperature
- The chemical processes include soil salinity, soil acidity and soil alkalinity.
- The hydrological processes include evaporation, runoff, and soil salinity.

Examples of processes can be found in.

== Field data ==
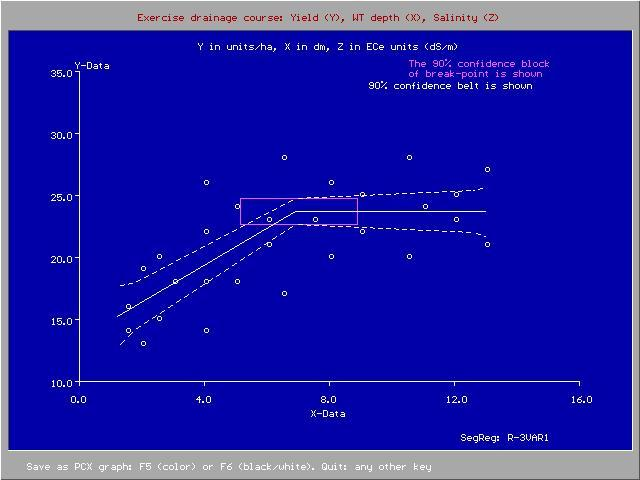
Crop yield (Y) and depth of water table (X in dm)

In drainage research the collection and analysis of field data is important.

In dealing with field data one must expect considerable random variation owing to the large number of natural processes involved and the large variability of plant and soil properties and hydrological conditions.

An example of a relation between crop yield and depth of water table subject to random natural variation, determined using segmented regression, is shown in the attached graph.

When analysing field data with random variation a proper application of statistical principles like in regression and frequency analysis is necessary.

== Soil salinity control ==
In irrigated lands, subsurface drainage may be required to leach the salts brought into the soil with the irrigation water to prevent soil salination.

Agro-hydro-salinity and leaching models like SaltMod may be helpful to determine the drainage requirement.
