= Leech (surname) =

Family name

Leech is an English surname, originally denoting a physician (in reference to the medical practice of bloodletting). Notable people with the surname include:

- Allen Leech (born 1981), Irish stage, television and film actor
- Andrew Leech (born 1952), English cricketer
- Faith Leech (1941–2013), Australian freestyle swimmer
- Fred Leech (1923–2001), English footballer
- Geoffrey Leech (1936–2014), specialist in English language and linguistics
- George L. Leech (1890–1985), American prelate of the Roman Catholic Church
- George Leech (actor) (1921–2012), British actor and stunt performer
- Gwyneth Leech, American artist
- Haliburton Hume Leech (1908–1939), Royal Air Force aviator, air racer and test pilot
- James Russell Leech (1888–1952), Republican member of the U.S. House of Representatives from Pennsylvania
- John Leech (jurist) (fl. 1330s), English medieval professor of canon law
- John Leech (caricaturist) (1817–1864), English caricaturist and illustrator
- John Henry Leech (1862–1900), British entomologist
- John Leech (mathematician) (1926–1992), British mathematician, discoverer of the Leech Lattice
- John Leech (politician) (born 1971), British Liberal Democrat Councillor in Manchester and former Member of Parliament
- Kenneth Leech (1939–2015), Anglican priest and Christian socialist
- Noyes Leech (1921–2010), American law professor at the University of Pennsylvania Law School
- Margaret Leech (1893–1974), American historian and fiction writer
- Michelle Leech, Australian academic clinician-scientist and rheumatologist
- Richard Leech (1922–2004), Irish actor
- Richard Leech (tenor) (born 1957), American operatic tenor
- Ryan Leech (born 1979), Canadian trials mountain bike rider
- Samuel Leech (1798–1848), sailor in the Royal Navy and the United States Navy during the War of 1812
- William John Leech (1881–1968), Irish painter
