= Salt balance =

Salt balance may refer to

- Osmoregulation
- Soil salinity
- Salt balance in the soil

== See also ==
- Soil salinity control
