= Leash (disambiguation) =

A leash is a restraint for pets.

Leash may also refer to:

- Child leash or harness
- Leash (BDSM), used on humans
- "Leash" (song), by Sky Ferreira
- "Leash", a song by Pearl Jam from their 1993 album Vs.
- Surfboard leash, the cord that attaches a surfboard to the surfer
- Among hunters, a collection of three hares is called a "leash"

== See also ==
- Leach (disambiguation)
- Leech (disambiguation)
