= Index of chemical engineering articles =

This is an alphabetical list of articles pertaining specifically to chemical engineering.

== A ==
Absorption -- Adsorption -- Analytical chemistry --

== B ==
Bioaccumulate -- Biochemical engineering -- Biochemistry -- Biochemistry topics list -- Bioinformatics -- Biology -- Bioprocess Engineering -- Biomolecular engineering -- Bioinformatics -- Biomedical engineering -- Bioseparation -- Biotechnology -- Bioreactor -- Biotite --

== C ==
Catalysis -- Catalytic cracking -- Catalytic reforming -- Catalytic reaction engineering -- Ceramics -- Certified Chartered Chemical Engineers -- Chartered Chemical Engineers -- Chemical engineering -- Chemical kinetics -- Chemical reaction -- Chemical synthesis -- Chemical vapor deposition (CVD) -- Chemical solution deposition -- Chemistry -- Chromatographic separation -- Circulating fluidized bed -- Combustion -- Computational fluid dynamics (CFD) -- Conservation of energy -- Conservation of mass -- Conservation of momentum -- Crystallization processes --

== D ==
Deal-Grove model -- Dehumidification -- Dehydrogenation -- Depressurization -- Desorption -- Desulfonation -- Desulfurization -- Diffusion -- Distillation -- Drag coefficient -- Drying --

== E ==
Electrochemical engineering -- Electrodialysis -- Electrokinetic phenomena -- Electrodeposition -- Electrolysis -- Electrolytic reduction -- Electroplating -- Electrostatic precipitation -- Electrowinning -- Emulsion -- Energy -- Engineering -- Engineering economics -- Enzymatic reaction --

== F ==
Filtration -- Fluid dynamics -- Flow battery -- Fuel cell -- Fuel technology --

== G ==
Gasification --

== H ==
Heat transfer -- History of chemical engineering -- Hydrometallurgy --

== I ==
Immobilization -- Inorganic chemistry -- Ion exchange --

== K ==
Kinetics (physics) --

== L ==
Laboratory -- Leaching --

== M ==
Mass balance -- Mass transfer -- Materials science -- Medicinal chemistry -- Microelectronics -- Microfluidics -- Microreaction technology -- Mineral processing -- Mixing -- Momentum transfer --

== N ==
Nanoengineering -- Nanotechnology --

== O ==
Organic chemistry --

== P ==
Periodic table -- Pharmacology -- Physical chemistry -- Plastic -- Polymer -- Process control -- Process design -- Process modeling -- Process safety --

== Q ==
Qualitative inorganic analysis -- Quantitative analysis -- Quantum chemistry -- Quartz --

== R ==
Rate equation -- Reverse osmosis --

== S ==
Science -- Separation processes -- Solid-state chemistry -- Solvent extraction -- Supercritical fluids --

== T ==
Thermodynamics -- Timeline of chemical element discovery -- Transport phenomena

== U ==
Ultrafiltration -- Unit operation --

== V ==
Volatility --

== W ==
Water and waste water treatment -- Waste minimization --

== Z ==
Zeolite -- Zinc -- Zinnwaldite -- Zircon -- Zirconium -- Zone melting --
