= Leaching =

Leaching is the loss or extraction of certain materials from a carrier into a liquid (usually, but not always a solvent), and may refer to:

- Leaching (agriculture), the loss of water-soluble plant nutrients from the soil; or applying a small amount of excess irrigation to avoid soil salinity
- Leaching (chemistry), the process of extracting substances from a solid by dissolving them in a liquid
- Leaching (metallurgy), a widely used extractive metallurgy technique which converts metals into soluble salts in aqueous media
  - Dump leaching, an industrial process to extract metals from ore taken directly from the mine and stacked on the leach pad without crushing
  - Heap leaching, an industrial process to extract metals from ore which has been crushed into small chunks
  - Tank leaching, a hydro metallurgical method of extracting valuable material from ore
  - In-situ leaching, a process of recovering minerals such as copper and uranium through boreholes drilled into the deposit
- Leaching (pedology), the loss of mineral and organic solutes due to percolation from soil
- Bioleaching, the extraction of specific metals from their ores through the use of bacteria and fungi

== See also ==
- Leachate, the liquid that drains or 'leaches' from a landfill
- Leach (disambiguation)
- Leech (disambiguation)
- Leeching (disambiguation)
