= Waterlogging (agriculture) =

Saturation of soil with water

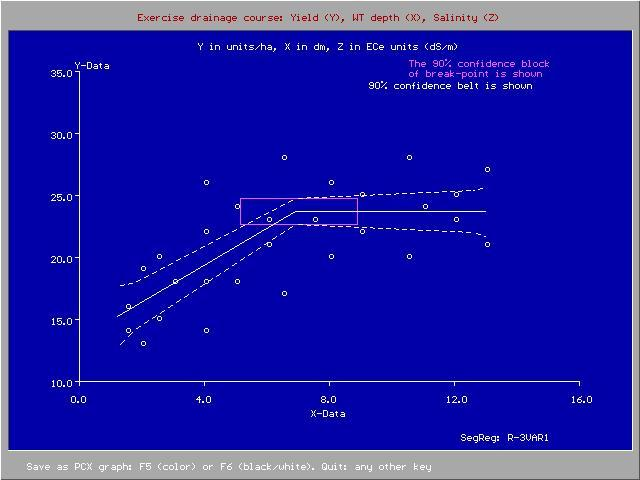
Crop yield (Y) and depth of water table (X in dm). At shallow depth the yield reduces.

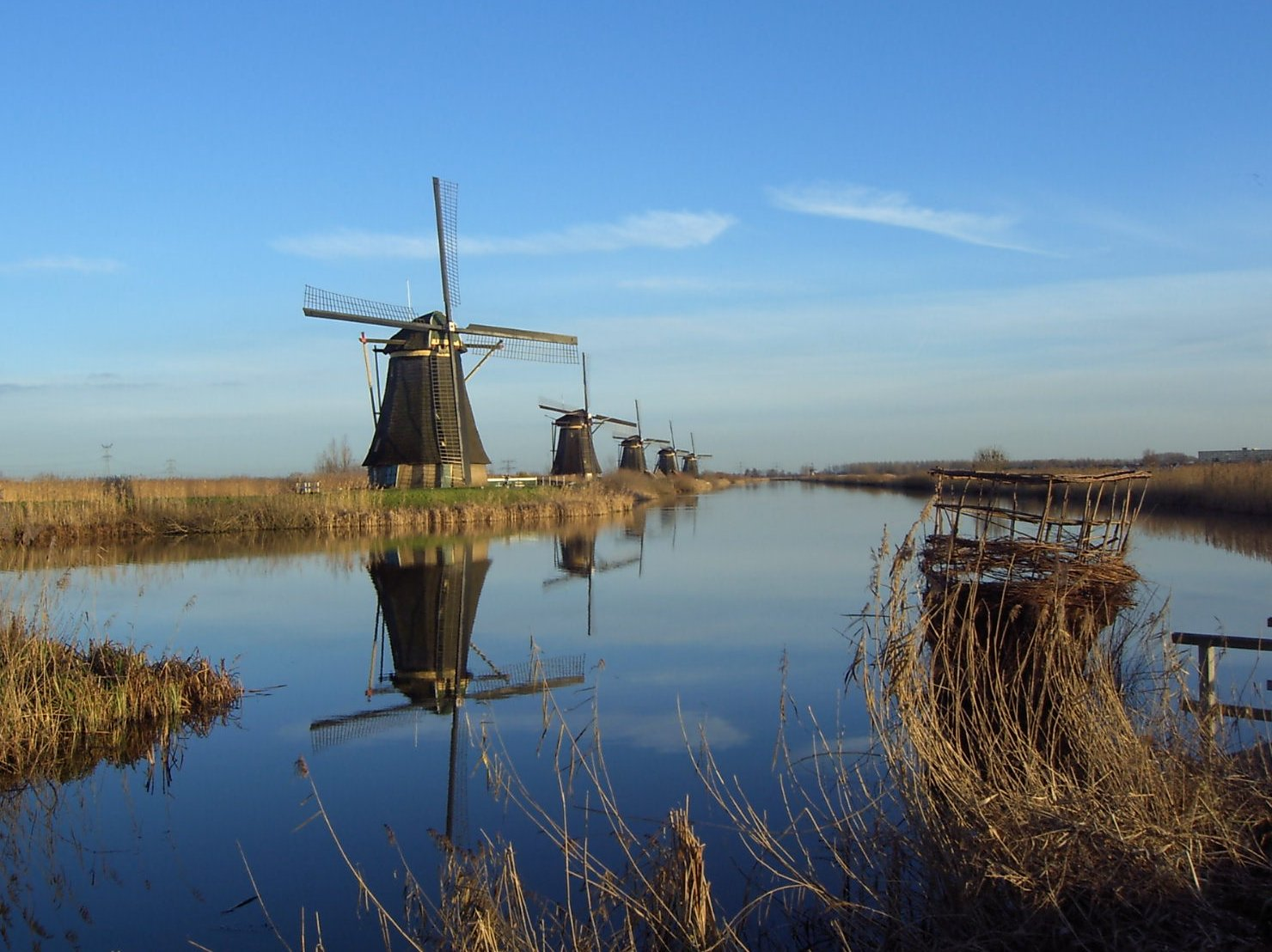
Antique Dutch windmills used to pump water into the embanked river to prevent waterlogging of the lowlands (polders) behind them.

Waterlogging is the saturation of soil with water. Soil may be regarded as waterlogged when it is nearly saturated with water much of the time such that its air phase is restricted and anaerobic conditions prevail. In extreme cases of prolonged waterlogging, anaerobiosis occurs, the roots of mesophytes suffer, and the subsurface reducing atmosphere leads to such processes as denitrification, methanogenesis, and the reduction of iron and manganese oxides.

All plants, including crops, require air (specifically, oxygen) to respire, produce energy, and keep their cells alive. In agriculture, waterlogging typically blocks air from getting to the roots. With the exception of rice (Oryza sativa), most crops like maize and potato, are therefore highly intolerant to waterlogging. Plant cells use a variety of signals such the oxygen concentration, plant hormones like ethylene, energy and sugar status to acclimate to waterlogging-induced oxygen deprivation. Roots can survive waterlogging by forming aerenchyma, inducing anaerobic metabolism, and changing root system architecture.

In irrigated agricultural land, waterlogging is often accompanied by soil salinity as waterlogged soils prevent leaching of the salts imported by the irrigation water.

From a gardening point of view, waterlogging is the process whereby the soil hardens to the point where neither air nor water can soak through.

== See also ==
- Drainage
- Drainage research
- Drainage system (agriculture)
- Effects of weather on sport
- Environmental impact of irrigation
- Polder
- Redox
- Soil salinity control
- Swamp
- Watertable control
