= Fred Leech =

English footballer

Personal information
- Date of birth: 5 December 1923
- Place of birth: Stalybridge, England
- Date of death: December 2001 (aged 77–78)
- Place of death: Tameside, England
- Position: Centre forward

Senior career*
Years	Team	Apps	(Gls)
- Hurst
1945–1947	Bradford City	7	(2)
Total		7	(2)
- * Club domestic league appearances and goals

Fred Leech (5 December 1923 – December 2001) was an English professional footballer who played as a centre forward.

== Career ==
Born in Stalybridge, Leech played for Hurst and Bradford City. During his time with Bradford City he made seven appearances in the Football League, scoring two goals.

He also played for Range Boilers and Manchester City. He signed for Mossley from Goslings, playing six games and scoring twice in 1946–47 season before going on to play for Stockport County, Accrington Stanley, Crewe Alexandra and Hyde United.

== Sources ==
- Frost, Terry (1988). Bradford City A Complete Record 1903-1988. Breedon Books Sport. ISBN 0-907969-38-0.
