= Leech Creek =

Stream in Columbia and Sauk County, Wisconsin, U.S.

Coordinates: 43°31′22″N 89°35′02″W

Leech Creek is a stream in Columbia and Sauk counties, in the U.S. state of Wisconsin.

Leech Creek was named on account of the water "leaching" through the soil.

== See also ==
- List of rivers of Wisconsin
