= Andrew Leech =

English cricketer (born 1952)

Personal information
- Full name: Andrew David Leech
- Born: 9 March 1952 (age 74); Farnworth, Lancashire, England
- Batting: Right-handed
- Bowling: Right-arm medium

Domestic team information
- Years: Team
- 1972: Oxford University

Career statistics
| Competition | First-class |
|---|---|
| Matches | 9 |
| Runs scored | 24 |
| Batting average | 3.42 |
| 100s/50s | –/– |
| Top score | 8* |
| Balls bowled | 953 |
| Wickets | 12 |
| Bowling average | 43.41 |
| 5 wickets in innings | – |
| 10 wickets in match | – |
| Best bowling | 3/40 |
| Catches/stumpings | 3/– |
- Source: Cricinfo, 25 April 2020

Andrew David Leech (born 9 March 1952) is an English former first-class cricketer.

Leech was born at Farnworth in Lancashire and later studied at Jesus College at the University of Oxford. While studying at Oxford, he played first-class cricket for Oxford University in 1972, making his debut against Warwickshire and playing a total of nine first-class matches for Oxford that year. He scored 24 runs in his nine matches, while with his right-arm medium pace bowling, he took just 12 wickets at an average of 43.41 and a best figures of 3 for 40.
