= Leach (steam automobile company) =

Defunct American motor vehicle manufacturer

Leach or Leach Steamer was a veteran era American automobile company in Everett, Massachusetts, from 1899 to 1901.

== History ==
John M. Leach turned his Everett Cycle Company into Leach Motor Vehicle Company in 1899. The Leach car was a runabout steamer built on a frame of steel tubing with suspension by three elliptical springs. The boiler was fed automatically and the fuel was gasoline. In 1901 the company was closed.
