= Watertable control =

Use of drainage to control the groundwater level in an area

In geotechnical engineering, watertable control is the practice of controlling the height of the water table by drainage. Its main applications are in agricultural land (to improve the crop yield using agricultural drainage systems) and in cities to manage the extensive underground infrastructure that includes the foundations of large buildings, underground transit systems, and extensive utilities (water supply networks, sewerage, storm drains, and underground electrical grids).

== Description and definitions ==
Subsurface land drainage aims at controlling the water table of the groundwater in originally waterlogged land at a depth acceptable for the purpose for which the land is used. The depth of the water table with drainage is greater than without.

=== Purpose ===
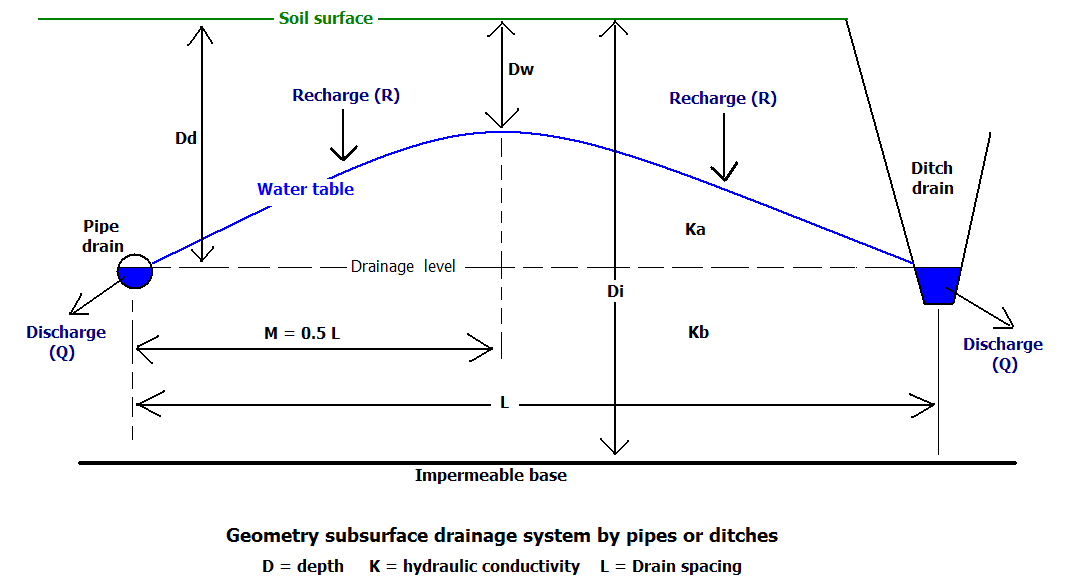
Figure 1. Drainage parameters in watertable control

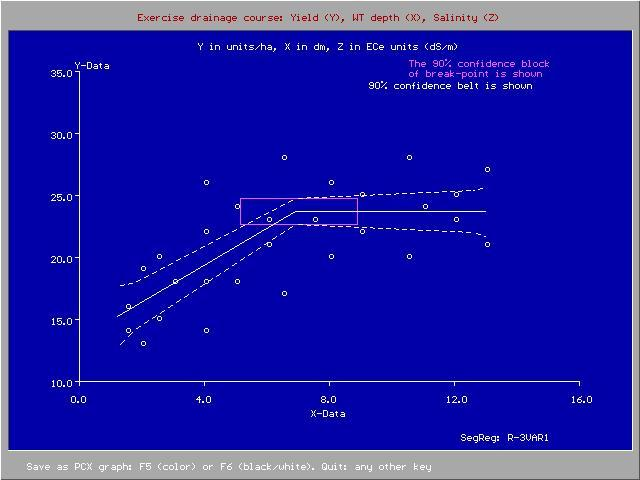
Figure 2. Crop yield (Y) and depth of water table (X in dm)

In agricultural land drainage, the purpose of water table control is to establish a depth of the water table (Figure 1) that no longer interferes negatively with the necessary farm operations and crop yields (Figure 2, made with segmented regression).
In addition, land drainage can help with soil salinity control.
The soil's hydraulic conductivity plays an important role in drainage design.

The development of agricultural drainage criteria is required to give the designer and manager of the drainage system a target to achieve in terms of maintenance of an optimum depth of the water table.

=== Optimization ===
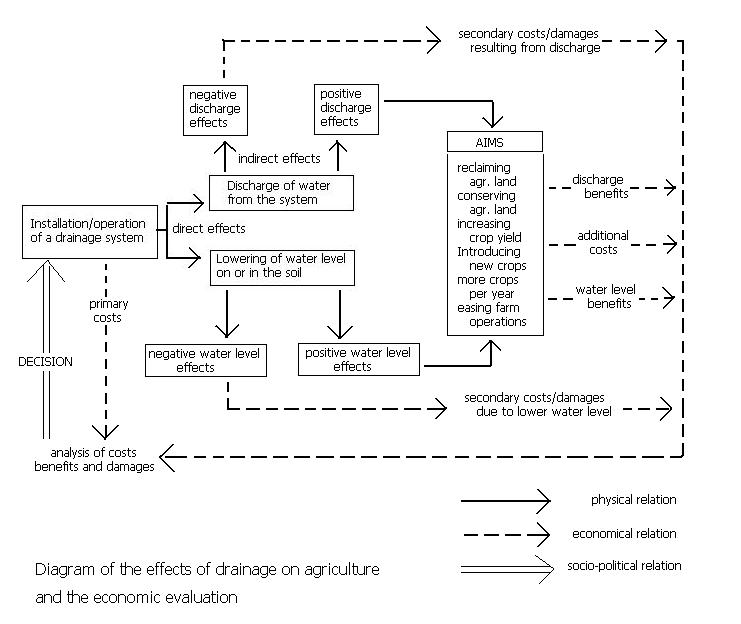
Figure 3. Positive and negative effects of land drainage

Optimization of the depth of the water table is related to the benefits and costs of the drainage system (Figure 3). The shallower the permissible depth of the water table, the lower the cost of the drainage system to be installed to achieve this depth. However, the lowering of the originally too shallow depth by land drainage entails side effects. These have also to be taken into account, including the costs of mitigation of negative side effects.

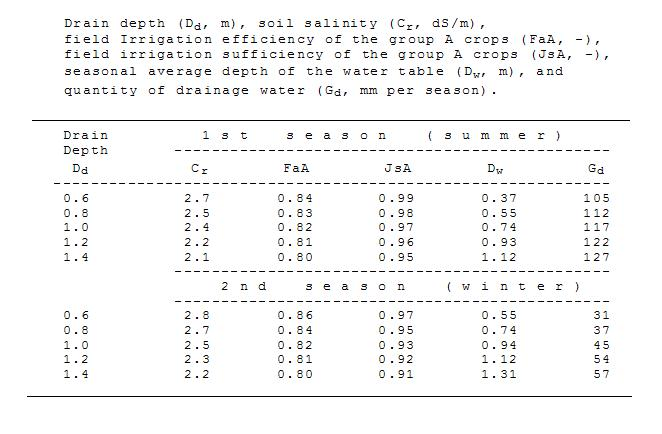
Figure 4. Example of effects of drain depth

The optimization of drainage design and the development of drainage criteria are discussed in the article on drainage research.

Figure 4 shows an example of the effect of drain depth on soil salinity and various irrigation/drainage parameters as simulated by the SaltMod program.

=== History ===
Historically, agricultural land drainage started with the digging of relatively shallow open ditches that received both runoff from the land surface and outflow of groundwater. Hence the ditches had a surface as well as a subsurface drainage function.
By the end of the 19th century and early in the 20th century it was felt that the ditches were a hindrance for the farm operations and the ditches were replaced by buried lines of clay pipes (tiles), each tile about 30 cm long. Hence the term "tile drainage".
Since 1960, one started using long, flexible, corrugated plastic (PVC or PE) pipes that could be installed efficiently in one go by trenching machines. The pipes could be pre-wrapped with an envelope material, like synthetic fibre and geotextile, that would prevent the entry of soil particles into the drains.
Thus, land drainage became a powerful industry. At the same time agriculture was steering towards maximum productivity, so that the installation of drainage systems came in full swing.

=== Environment ===
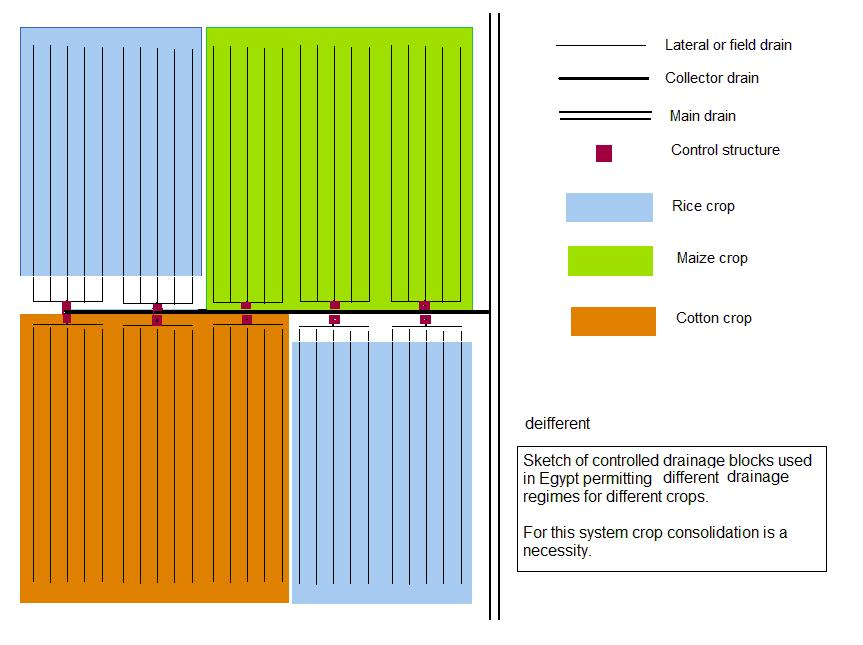
Figure 5. Controlled drainage

As a result of large scale developments, many modern drainage projects were over-designed, while the negative environmental side effects were ignored. In circles with environmental concern, the profession of land drainage got a poor reputation, sometimes justly so, sometimes unjustified, notably when land drainage was confused with the more encompassing activity of wetland reclamation. Nowadays, in some countries, the hardline trend is reversed. Further, checked or controlled drainage systems were introduced, as shown in Figure 5 and discussed on the page: Drainage system (agriculture).

=== Drainage design ===
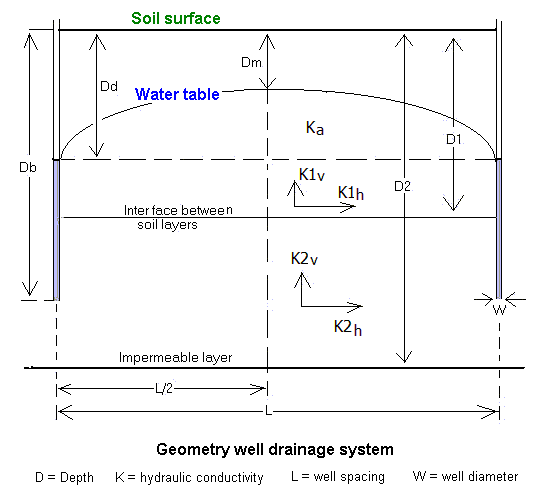
Figure 6. Geometry of a well drainage system

The design of subsurface drainage systems in terms layout, depth and spacing of the drains is often done using subsurface drainage equations with parameters like drain depth, depth of the water table, soil depth, hydraulic conductivity of the soil and drain discharge. The drain discharge is found from an agricultural water balance.
The computations can be done using computer models like EnDrain, which uses the hydraulic equivalent of Joule's law in electricity.

=== Drainage by wells ===
Subsurface drainage of groundwater can also be accomplished by pumped wells (vertical drainage, in contrast to horizontal drainage). Drainage wells have been used extensively in the Salinity Control and Reclamation Program (SCARP) in the Indus valley of Pakistan. Although the experiences were not overly successful, the feasibility of this technique in areas with deep and permeable aquifers is not to be discarded. The well spacings in these areas can be so wide (more than 1000m) that the installation of vertical drainage systems could be relatively cheap compared to horizontal subsurface drainage (drainage by pipes, ditches, trenches, at a spacing of 100m or less). For the design of a well field for control of the water table, the WellDrain model may be helpful.

=== Classification ===
A classification of drainage systems is found in the article Drainage system (agriculture).

== Effects on crop yield ==
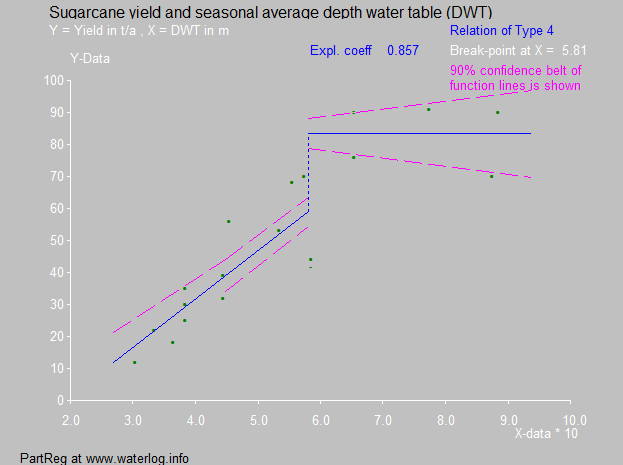
Yield of sugarcane versus depth of the water table, Australia. The critical depth is 0.6 m.

Most crops need a water table at a minimum depth. For some important food and fiber crops a classification was made because at shallower depths the crop suffers a yield decline.

Crop and location	Tolerance DWT(cm)	Classification	Explanation
Wheat, Nile Delta, Egypt	45	Very tolerant	Resists shallow water tables
Sugar cane, Australia	60	Tolerant	The water table should be deeper than 60 cm
Banana, Surinam	70	Slightly sensitive	Yield declines at water tables < than 70 cm deep
Cotton, Nile Delta	90	Sensitive	Cotton needs dry feet, water table should be deep

(Where DWT = depth to water table)

== See also ==
- Dewatering
- Subsurface dyke
