= Leach (food) =

Medieval confection

A leach (sometimes leech or leche) was a popular medieval sweetmeat (confection) consisting of a thick, jelly-like preserve which set hard enough to be sliced for serving.

The candy consisted of sugar and flavourings such as almonds, dates, dried fruit, peel, and fruit extracts (such as rose water), sometimes spiced with ginger, aniseed, cinnamon and other spices or with milk added, and thickened with isinglass or gum arabic.

Leaches were often shaped or moulded into fancy shapes such as hearts, diamonds, clubs, spades, or crescent moons. They would feature as a decorative display on a silver tray at the dessert course of banquets, where specialised sweetmeat spoons with a fork at the handle end might be provided. They were also eaten throughout the day (perhaps as a breath freshener), and were a favourite of Queen Elizabeth I of England (r. 1558–1603).

== See also ==
- The Queen-Like Closet
- Medieval cuisine
