= Leach Range =

Mountain range in Nevada, United States

- Location within Nevada

Highest point
- Peak: Murdock Mountain
- Elevation: 2,533 m (8,310 ft)

Geography
- Country: United States
- State: Nevada
- District: Elko County
- Range coordinates: 41°19′0.722″N 114°19′26.077″W
- Topo map: USGS Montello Canyon

The Leach Range is a mountain range in Elko County, Nevada. Murdock Mountain at 8,311 feet is the highest point in the range.
