= Low-energy adaptive clustering hierarchy =

Low-energy adaptive clustering hierarchy ("LEACH") is a TDMA-based MAC protocol which is integrated with clustering and a simple routing protocol in wireless sensor networks (WSNs). The goal of LEACH is to lower the energy consumption required to create and maintain clusters in order to improve the life time of a wireless sensor network.

== Protocol ==
LEACH is a hierarchical protocol in which most nodes transmit to cluster heads, and the cluster heads aggregate and compress the data and forward it to the base station (sink). Each node uses a stochastic algorithm at each round to determine whether it will become a cluster head in this round. LEACH assumes that each node has a radio powerful enough to directly reach the base station or the nearest cluster head, but that using this radio at full power all the time would waste energy.

Nodes that have been cluster heads cannot become cluster heads again for P rounds, where P is the desired percentage of cluster heads. Thereafter, each node has a 1/P probability of becoming a cluster head again. At the end of each round, each node that is not a cluster head selects the closest cluster head and joins that cluster. The cluster head then creates a schedule for each node in its cluster to transmit its data.

All nodes that are not cluster heads only communicate with the cluster head in a TDMA fashion, according to the schedule created by the cluster head. They do so using the minimum energy needed to reach the cluster head, and only need to keep their radios on during their time slot.

LEACH also uses CDMA so that each cluster uses a different set of CDMA codes, to minimize interference between clusters.

== Properties ==
Properties of this algorithm include:

- Cluster based
- Random cluster head selection each round with rotation. Or cluster head selection based on sensor having highest energy
- Cluster membership adaptive
- Data aggregation at cluster head
- Cluster head communicate directly with sink or user
- Communication done with cluster head via TDMA
- Threshold value

== Shortcomings of LEACH ==
Shortcomings of LEACH include:

- Remaining energy among the nodes isn't considered when selecting Cluster Heads
- Random and variable size cluster formations
- Random and uneven distribution of cluster heads
- Single hop communication in situations where energy use is less efficient from cluster head to base station
- Multi-clustering might not be required at some point and, at some point, number of optimum clusters could be as high as N (number of live nodes in the network)
