= Leeching =

Leeching may refer to:

- Leeching (medical), also called hirudotherapy, the use of leeches for bloodletting or medical therapy
- Leeching (computing), using others' information or effort without providing anything in return
- Image leeching, direct linking to an object, such as an image, on a remote site

== See also ==
- Leaching (disambiguation)
