= Leech Lake (Chisago County, Minnesota) =

Lake in the state of Minnesota, United States

- Location within Minnesota
- Location: Chisago County, Minnesota
- Coordinates: 45°39′30″N 93°2′34″W
- Type: lake

Leech Lake is a lake in Chisago County, Minnesota, in the United States.

Leech Lake was named for the great number of leeches in its waters.

== See also ==
- List of lakes in Minnesota
