= Leaching (agriculture) =

Loss of water-soluble plant nutrients from soil due to rain and irrigation

In agriculture, leaching is the loss of water-soluble plant nutrients from the soil, due to rain and irrigation. Soil structure, crop planting, type and application rates of fertilizers, and other factors are taken into account to avoid excessive nutrient loss. Leaching may also refer to the practice of applying a small amount of excess irrigation where the water has a high salt content to avoid salts from building up in the soil (salinity control). Where this is practiced, drainage must also usually be employed, to carry away the excess water.

Leaching is a natural environment concern when it contributes to groundwater contamination. As water from rain, flooding, or other sources seeps into the ground, it can dissolve chemicals and carry them into the underground water supply. Of particular concern are hazardous waste dumps and landfills, and, in agriculture, excess fertilizer, improperly stored animal manure, and biocides (e.g. pesticides, fungicides, insecticides and herbicides).

== Nitrogen leaching ==
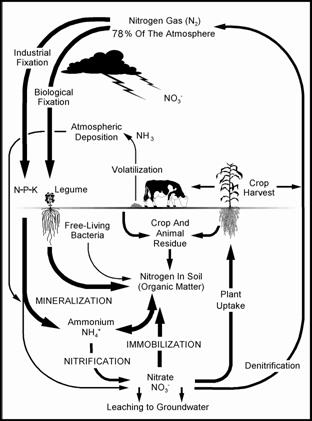
Nitrogen forms and pathways within an agricultural production system

Nitrogen is a common element in nature and an essential plant nutrient. Approximately 78% of Earth's atmosphere is nitrogen (N_{2}). The strong bond between the atoms of N_{2} makes this gas quite inert and not directly usable by plants and animals. As nitrogen naturally cycles through the air, water and soil it undergoes various chemical and biological transformations. Nitrogen promotes plant growth. Livestock then eat the crops producing manure, which is returned to the soil, adding organic and mineral forms of nitrogen. The cycle is complete when the next crop uses the amended soil. To increase food production, fertilizers, such as nitrate (NO_{3}^{–}) and ammonium (NH_{4}^{+}), which are easily absorbed by plants, are introduced to the plant root zone. However, soils do not absorb the excess NO_{3}^{–} ions, which then move downward freely with drainage water, and are leached into groundwater, streams and oceans. The degree of leaching is affected by:

- soil type and structure. For example, sandy soil holds little water while clay soils have high water-retention rates;
- the amount of water used by the plants/crops;
- how much nitrate is already present in the soil.

The level of nitrous oxide (N_{2}O) in the Earth's atmosphere is increasing at a rate of 0.2 to 0.3% annually. Anthropogenic sources of nitrogen are 50% greater than from natural sources, such as soils and oceans. Leached agricultural inputs, i.e. fertilizers and manures, account for 75% of the anthropogenic sources of nitrogen. The Food and Agriculture Organization of the United Nations (FAO) estimates world demand for nitrogen fertilizers increased by 1.7% annually between 2011 and 2015, an increase of 7.5 million tonnes. Regional increases of nitrogen fertilizer use are expected to be 67% by Asia, 18% by the Americas, 10% by Europe, 3% by Africa, and 1% by Oceania.

== Phosphorus leaching ==
Phosphorus (P) is a key nutrient regarding the eutrophication of surface waters and has been shown to limit algae growth in lake environments. Loss of P from agricultural fields has long been recognized as one of the major threats to surface water quality. Leaching is an important transport pathway for P losses from agricultural fields in predominantly flat areas with sandy soils or soils prone to preferential flow. As opposed to nitrogen phosphorus does interact with soil particles via adsorption and desorption. Important potential adsorption sites for P in soils are surfaces of iron and aluminum oxides or hydroxides such as gibbsite or ferrihydrite. Soils, especially those rich in such minerals do hence have a potential to store P added with fertilizer or manure. Adsorbed P stands in a complex equilibrium with P in the soil solution which is controlled by a multitude of different factors such as:

- the availability of adsorption sites;
- the concentration of phosphorus and other anions in the soil water solution;
- soil pH;
- soil redox potential.

Phosphorus will leach when this equilibrium is shifted such that either previously adsorbed P is released into the soil solution or additional P cannot be adsorbed anymore. Many cultivated soils have been receiving fertilizer or manure P in amounts frequently exceeding the crop demand and this often over decades. Phosphorus added to such soils leaches simply because most of the potential adsorption sites are occupied by P input from the past, so called “legacy phosphorus”. Leaching of P may also be caused by changing chemical conditions in the soil. A decrease in the soils redox potential due to prolonged water saturation may lead to reductive dissolution of ferric iron minerals that are important P sorption sites. Phosphorus adsorbed to these minerals is consequently released into the soil solution as well and may be leached. This process is of special concern in the restoration of natural wetlands that have previously been drained for agricultural production.

== Health impacts ==
High levels of NO_{3} in water can adversely affect oxygen levels for both humans and aquatic systems. Human health issues include methemoglobinemia and anoxia, commonly referred to as blue baby syndrome. As a result of these toxic effects, regulatory agencies limit the amount of NO_{3} permissible in drinking water to 45 to 50 mg per liter. Eutrophication, a decline in oxygen content of water, of aquatic systems can cause the death of fish and other marine species. Finally, leaching of NO_{3} from acidic sources can increase the loss of calcium and other soil nutrients, thereby reducing an ecosystem's productivity.

== See also ==
- Leaching (pedology)
- Leaching model (soil)
- Soil salinity control (leaching requirement, leaching efficiency)
- SahysMod (spatial agro-hydro salinity, leaching and groundwater model)
