= Soil salinity control =

Controlling the problem of soil salinity

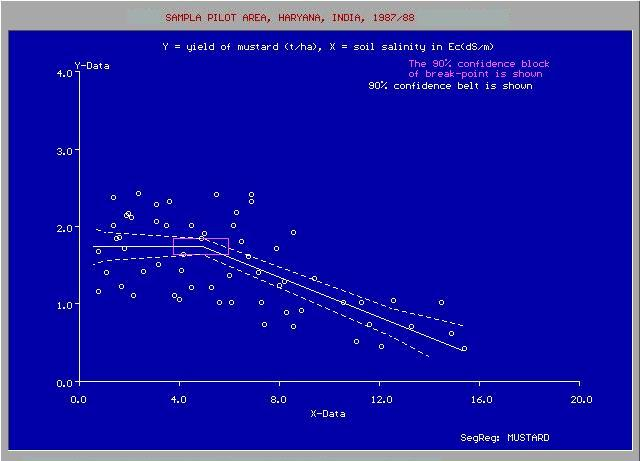
Yield of mustard (colza) and soil salinity

Soil salinity control refers to controlling the process and progress of soil salinity to prevent soil degradation by salination and reclamation of already salty (saline) soils. Soil reclamation is also known as soil improvement, rehabilitation, remediation, recuperation, or amelioration.

The primary man-made cause of salinization is irrigation. River water or groundwater used in irrigation contains salts, which remain in the soil after the water has evaporated.

The primary method of controlling soil salinity is to permit 10–20% of the irrigation water to leach the soil, so that it will be drained and discharged through an appropriate drainage system. The salt concentration of the drainage water is normally 5 to 10 times higher than that of the irrigation water which meant that salt export will more closely match salt import and it will not accumulate.

== Problems with soil salinity ==
Salty (saline) soils have high salt content. The predominant salt is normally sodium chloride (NaCl, "table salt"). Saline soils are therefore also sodic soils but there may be sodic soils that are not saline, but alkaline.

World Soil Salt Degradation

This damage is an average of 2,000 hectares of irrigated land in arid and semi-arid areas daily for more than 20 years across 75 countries (each week the world loses an area larger than Manhattan)...To feed the world's anticipated nine billion people by 2050, and with little new productive land available, it's a case of all lands needed on deck.—principal author Manzoor Qadir, Assistant Director, Water and Human Development, at UN University's Canadian-based Institute for Water, Environment and Health

According to a study by UN University, about 62 million hectares (240 thousand square miles; 150 million acres), representing 20% of the world's irrigated lands are affected, up from 45 million ha (170 thousand sq mi; 110 million acres) in the early 1990s. In the Indo-Gangetic Plain, home to over 10% of the world's population, crop yield losses for wheat, rice, sugarcane and cotton grown on salt-affected lands could be 40%, 45%, 48%, and 63%, respectively.

Salty soils are a common feature and an environmental problem in irrigated lands in arid and semi-arid regions, resulting in poor or little crop production. The causes of salty soils are often associated with high water tables, which are caused by a lack of natural subsurface drainage to the underground. Poor subsurface drainage may be caused by insufficient transport capacity of the aquifer or because water cannot exit the aquifer, for instance, if the aquifer is situated in a topographical depression.

Worldwide, the major factor in the development of saline soils is a lack of precipitation. Most naturally saline soils are found in (semi) arid regions and climates of the earth.

=== Primary cause ===
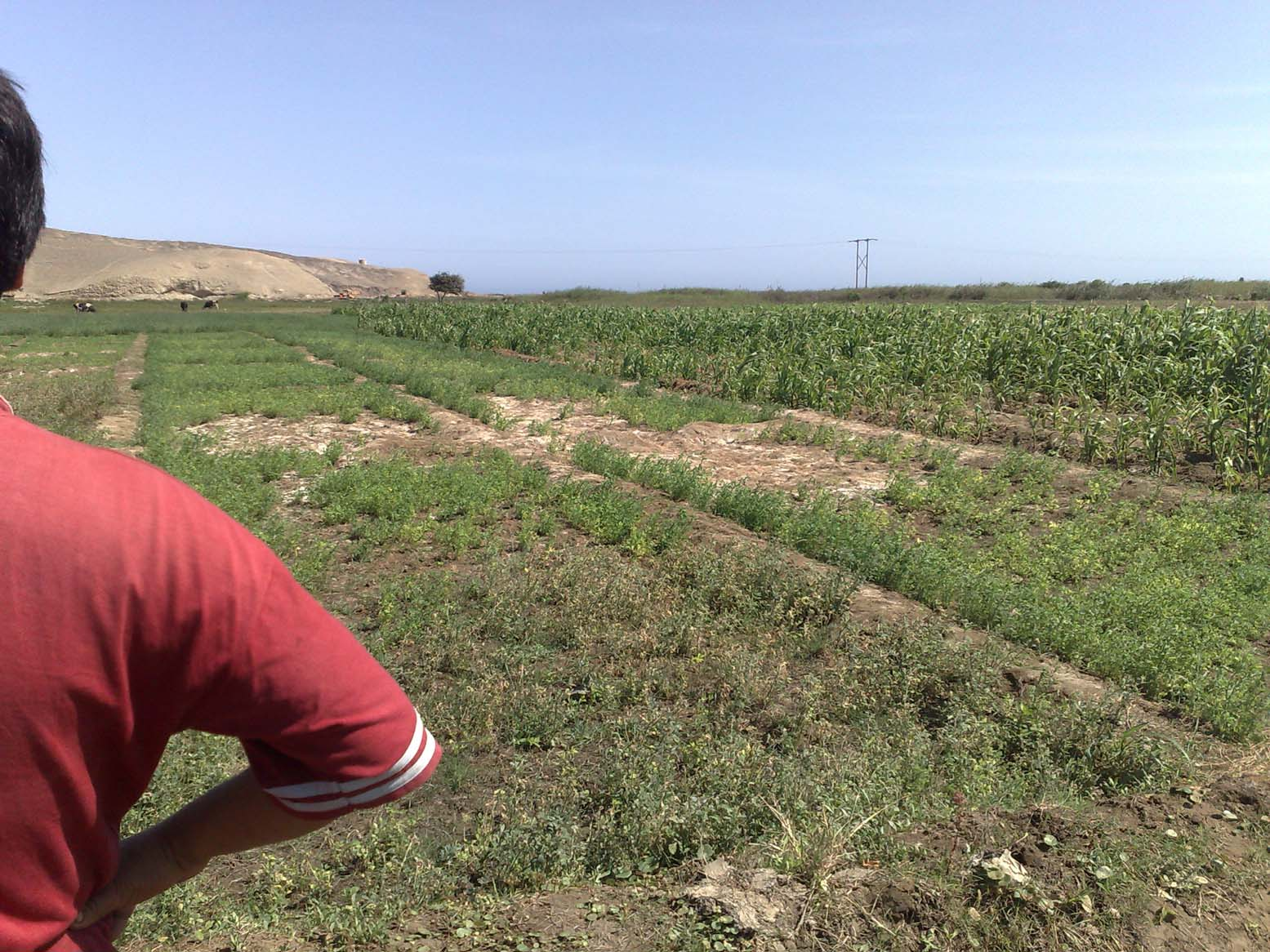
Irrigated saline land with poor crop stand

Man-made salinization is primarily caused by salt found in irrigation water. All irrigation water derived from rivers or groundwater, regardless of water purity, contains salts that remain behind in the soil after the water has evaporated.

For example, assuming irrigation water with a low salt concentration of 0.3 g/L (equal to 0.3 kg/m^{3} corresponding to an electric conductivity of about 0.5 FdS/m) and a modest annual supply of irrigation water of 10,000 m^{3}/ha (almost 3 mm/day) brings 3,000 kg salt/ha each year. With the absence of sufficient natural drainage (as in waterlogged soils), and proper leaching and drainage program to remove salts, this would lead to high soil salinity and reduced crop yields in the long run.

Much of the water used in irrigation has a higher salt content than 0.3 g/L, compounded by irrigation projects using a far greater annual supply of water. Sugar cane, for example, needs about 20,000 m^{3}/ha of water per year. As a result, irrigated areas often receive more than 3,000 kg/ha of salt per year, with some receiving as much as 10,000 kg/ha/year.

=== Secondary cause ===
The secondary cause of salinization is waterlogging in irrigated land. Irrigation causes changes to the natural water balance of irrigated lands. Large quantities of water in irrigation projects are not consumed by plants and must go somewhere. In irrigation projects, it is impossible to achieve 100% irrigation efficiency where all the irrigation water is consumed by the plants. The maximum attainable irrigation efficiency is about 70%, but usually, it is less than 60%. This means that minimum 30%, but usually more than 40% of the irrigation water is not evaporated and it must go somewhere.

Most of the water lost this way is stored underground which can change the original hydrology of local aquifers considerably. Many aquifers cannot absorb and transport these quantities of water, and so the water table rises leading to waterlogging.

Waterlogging causes three problems:

- The shallow water table and lack of oxygenation of the root zone reduces the yield of most crops.
- It leads to an accumulation of salts brought in with the irrigation water as their removal through the aquifer is blocked.
- With the upward seepage of groundwater, more salts are brought into the soil and the salination is aggravated.

Aquifer conditions in irrigated land and the groundwater flow have an important role in soil salinization, as illustrated here:

Illustration of the influence of aquifer conditions on soil salinization in irrigated land

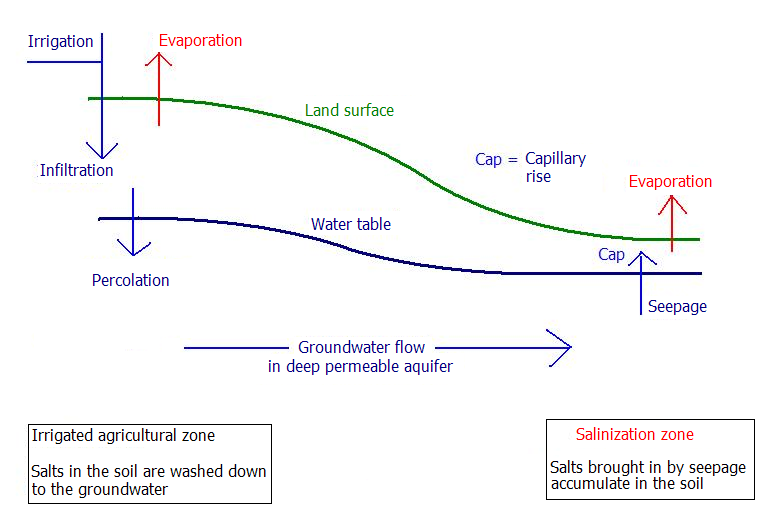
Soil salinization in the lower parts of undulating land with a good aquifer

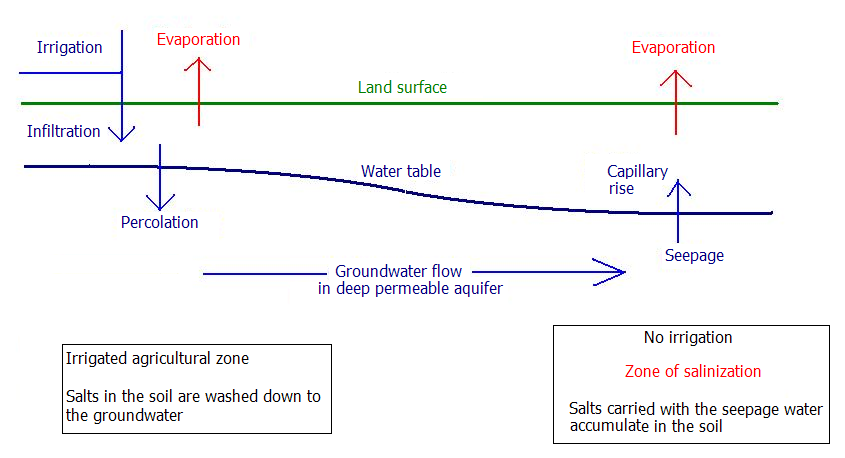
Soil salinization in the unirrigated parts of flat land with a good aquifer

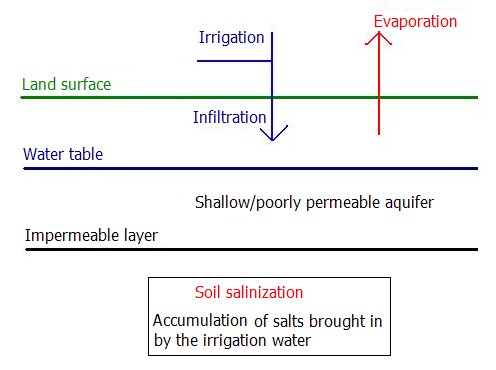
Soil salinization in irrigated flat land without an aquifer

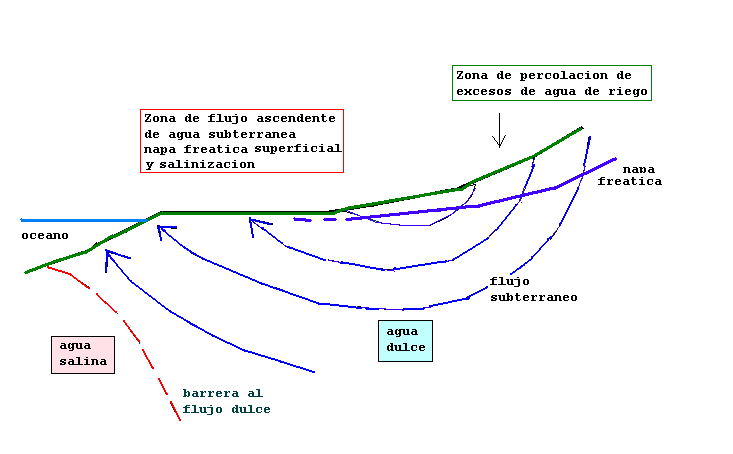
Soil salinization in a coastal delta from irrigation higher up

=== Salt affected area ===
Normally, the salinization of agricultural land affects a considerable area of 20% to 30% in irrigation projects. When the agriculture in such a fraction of the land is abandoned, a new salt and water balance is attained, a new equilibrium is reached and the situation becomes stable.

In India alone, thousands of square kilometers have been severely salinized. China and Pakistan do not lag far behind (perhaps China has even more salt affected land than India). A regional distribution of the 3,230,000 km^{2} of saline land worldwide is shown in the following table derived from the FAO/UNESCO Soil Map of the World.

Region	Area (10^{6}ha)
Australia	84.7
Africa	69.5
Latin America	59.4
Near and Middle East	53.1
Europe	20.7
Asia and Far East	19.5
Northern America	16.0

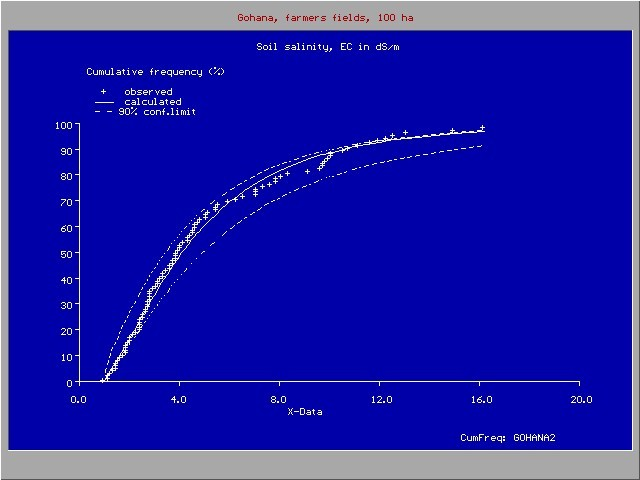
Spatial variation of soil salinity

=== Spatial variation ===
Although the principles of the processes of salinization are fairly easy to understand, it is more difficult to explain why certain parts of the land suffer from the problems and other parts do not, or to predict accurately which part of the land will fall victim. The main reason for this is the variation of natural conditions in time and space, the usually uneven distribution of the irrigation water, and the seasonal or yearly changes of agricultural practices. Only in lands with undulating topography is the prediction simple: the depressional areas will degrade the most.

The preparation of salt and water balances for distinguishable sub-areas in the irrigation project, or the use of agro-hydro-salinity models, can be helpful in explaining or predicting the extent and severity of the problems.

== Diagnosis ==
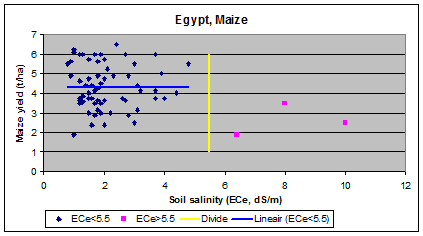
The maize crop (corn) in Egypt has a salt tolerance of ECe=5.5 dS/m beyond which the yield declines.

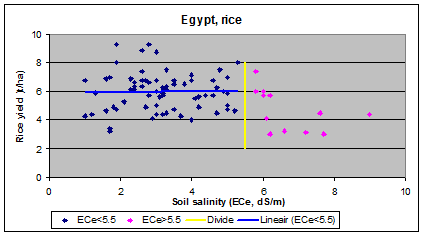
The rice crop in Egypt has a similar salt tolerance as maize.

=== Measurement ===
Soil salinity is measured as the salt concentration of the soil solution in tems of g/L or electric conductivity (EC) in dS/m. The relation between these two units is about 5/3: y g/L => 5y/3 dS/m. Seawater may have a salt concentration of 30 g/L (3%) and an EC of 50 dS/m.

The standard for the determination of soil salinity is from an extract of a saturated paste of the soil, and the EC is then written as ECe. The extract is obtained by centrifugation. The salinity can more easily be measured, without centrifugation, in a 2:1 or 5:1 water:soil mixture (in terms of g water per g dry soil) than from a saturated paste. The relation between ECe and EC_{2:1} is about 4, hence: ECe = 4EC_{1:2}.

=== Classification ===
Soils are considered saline when the ECe > 4. When 4 < ECe < 8, the soil is called slightly saline, when 8 < ECe < 16 it is called (moderately) saline, and when ECe > 16 severely saline.

=== Crop tolerance ===
Sensitive crops lose their vigor already in slightly saline soils; most crops are negatively affected by (moderately) saline soils, and only salinity resistant crops thrive in severely saline soils. The University of Wyoming and the Government of Alberta report data on the salt tolerance of plants.

== Principles of salinity control ==
Drainage is the primary method of controlling soil salinity. The system should permit a small fraction of the irrigation water (about 10 to 20 percent, the drainage or leaching fraction) to be drained and discharged out of the irrigation project.

In irrigated areas where salinity is stable, the salt concentration of the drainage water is normally 5 to 10 times higher than that of the irrigation water. Salt export matches salt import and salt will not accumulate.

When reclaiming already salinized soils, the salt concentration of the drainage water will initially be much higher than that of the irrigation water (for example 50 times higher). Salt export will greatly exceed salt import, so that with the same drainage fraction a rapid desalinization occurs. After one or two years, the soil salinity is decreased so much, that the salinity of the drainage water has come down to a normal value and a new, favorable, equilibrium is reached.

In regions with pronounced dry and wet seasons, the drainage system may be operated in the wet season only, and closed during the dry season. This practice of checked or controlled drainage saves irrigation water.

The discharge of salty drainage water may pose environmental problems to downstream areas. The environmental hazards must be considered very carefully and, if necessary mitigating measures must be taken. If possible, the drainage must be limited to wet seasons only, when the salty effluent inflicts the least harm.

== Drainage systems ==
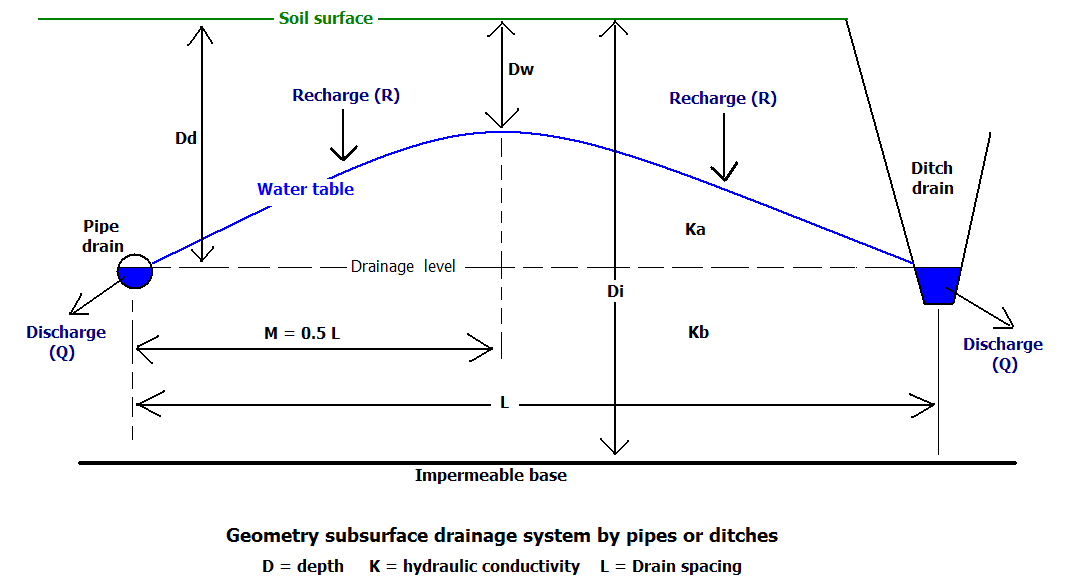
Parameters of a horizontal drainage system

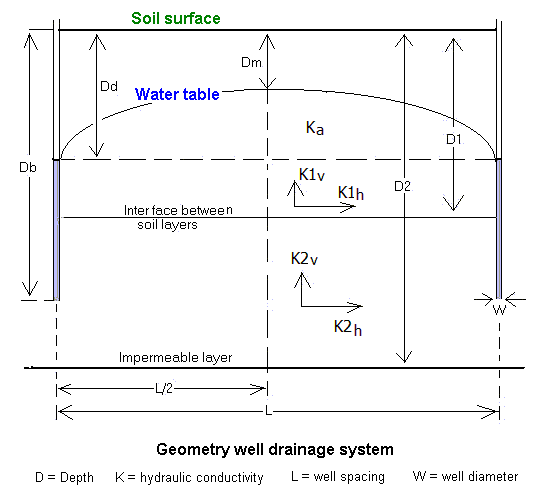
Parameters of a vertical drainage system

Land drainage for soil salinity control is usually by horizontal drainage system (figure left), but vertical systems (figure right) are also employed.

The drainage system designed to evacuate salty water also lowers the water table. To reduce the cost of the system, the lowering must be reduced to a minimum. The highest permissible level of the water table (or the shallowest permissible depth) depends on the irrigation and agricultural practices and kind of crops.

In many cases a seasonal average water table depth of 0.6 to 0.8 m is deep enough. This means that the water table may occasionally be less than 0.6 m (say 0.2 m just after an irrigation or a rain storm). This automatically implies that, in other occasions, the water table will be deeper than 0.8 m (say 1.2 m). The fluctuation of the water table helps in the breathing function of the soil while the expulsion of carbon dioxide (CO_{2}) produced by the plant roots and the inhalation of fresh oxygen (O_{2}) is promoted.

The establishing of a not-too-deep water table offers the additional advantage that excessive field irrigation is discouraged, as the crop yield would be negatively affected by the resulting elevated water table, and irrigation water may be saved.

The statements made above on the optimum depth of the water table are very general, because in some instances the required water table may be still shallower than indicated (for example in rice paddies), while in other instances it must be considerably deeper (for example in some orchards). The establishment of the optimum depth of the water table is in the realm of agricultural drainage criteria.

== Soil leaching ==
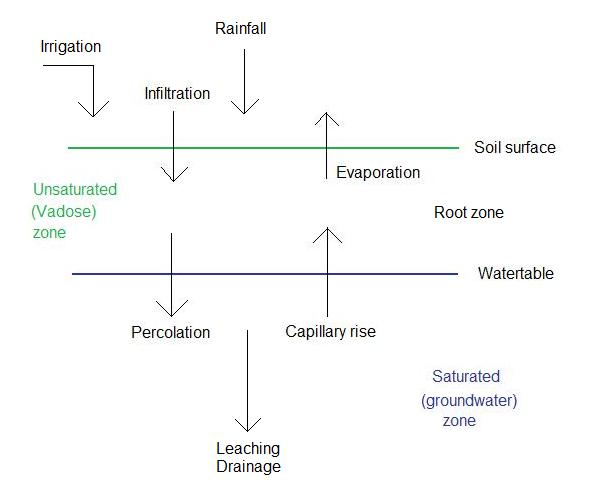
Water balance factors in the soil

The vadose zone of the soil below the soil surface and the water table is subject to four main hydrological inflow and outflow factors:

- Infiltration of rain and irrigation water (Irr) into the soil through the soil surface (Inf) :
- Inf = Rain + Irr
- Evaporation of soil water through plants and directly into the air through the soil surface (Evap)
- Percolation of water from the unsaturated zone soil into the groundwater through the watertable (Perc)
- Capillary rise of groundwater moving by capillary suction forces into the unsaturated zone (Cap)

In steady state (i.e. the amount of water stored in the unsaturated zone does not change in the long run) the water balance of the unsaturated zone reads: Inflow = Outflow, thus:

- Inf + Cap = Evap + Perc or:
- Irr + Rain + Cap = Evap + Perc

and the salt balance is

- Irr.Ci + Cap.Cc = Evap.Fc.Ce + Perc.Cp + Ss

where Ci is the salt concentration of the irrigation water, Cc is the salt concentration of the capillary rise, equal to the salt concentration of the upper part of the groundwater body, Fc is the fraction of the total evaporation transpired by plants, Ce is the salt concentration of the water taken up by the plant roots, Cp is the salt concentration of the percolation water, and Ss is the increase of salt storage in the unsaturated soil. This assumes that the rainfall contains no salts. Only along the coast this may not be true. Further it is assumed that no runoff or surface drainage occurs. The amount of removed by plants (Evap.Fc.Ce) is usually negligibly small: Evap.Fc.Ce = 0

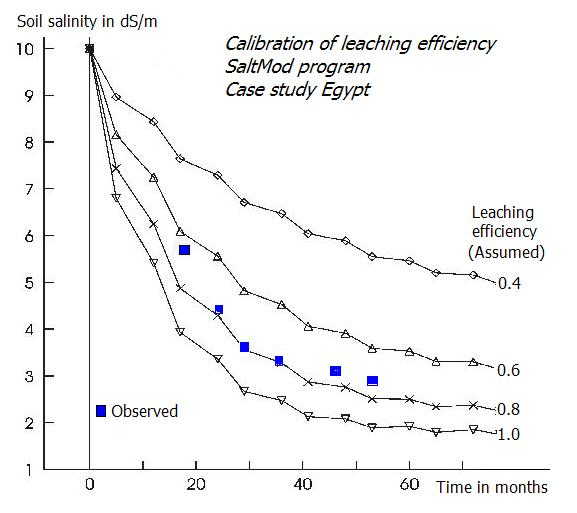
Leaching curves, calibrating leaching efficiency

The salt concentration Cp can be taken as a part of the salt concentration of the soil in the unsaturated zone (Cu) giving: Cp = Le.Cu, where Le is the leaching efficiency. The leaching efficiency is often in the order of 0.7 to 0.8, but in poorly structured, heavy clay soils it may be less. In the Leziria Grande polder in the delta of the Tagus river in Portugal it was found that the leaching efficiency was only 0.15.
Assuming that one wishes to avoid the soil salinity to increase and maintain the soil salinity Cu at a desired level Cd we have:
Ss = 0, Cu = Cd and Cp = Le.Cd. Hence the salt balance can be simplified to:

- Perc.Le.Cd = Irr.Ci + Cap.Cc

Setting the amount percolation water required to fulfill this salt balance equal to Lr (the leaching requirement) it is found that:

- Lr = (Irr.Ci + Cap.Cc) / Le.Cd .

Substituting herein Irr = Evap + Perc − Rain − Cap and re-arranging gives :

- Lr = [ (Evap−Rain).Ci + Cap(Cc−Ci) ] / (Le.Cd − Ci)

With this the irrigation and drainage requirements for salinity control can be computed too.
In irrigation projects in (semi)arid zones and climates it is important to check the leaching requirement, whereby the field irrigation efficiency (indicating the fraction of irrigation water percolating to the underground) is to be taken into account.
The desired soil salinity level Cd depends on the crop tolerance to salt. The University of Wyoming, US, and the Government of Alberta, Canada, report crop tolerance data.

== Strip cropping: an alternative ==
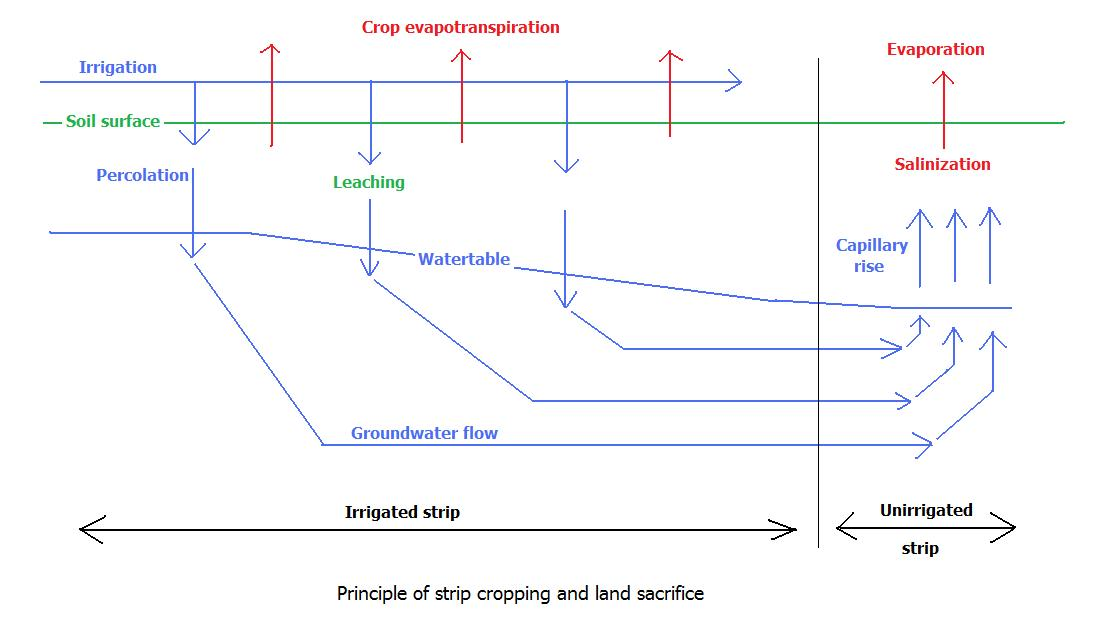
Hydrological principles of strip cropping to control the depth of the water table and the soil salinity

In irrigated lands with scarce water resources suffering from drainage (high water table) and soil salinity problems, strip cropping is sometimes practiced with strips of land where every other strip is irrigated while the strips in between are left permanently fallow.

Owing to the water application in the irrigated strips they have a higher water table which induces flow of groundwater to the unirrigated strips. This flow functions as subsurface drainage for the irrigated strips, whereby the water table is maintained at a not-too-shallow depth, leaching of the soil is possible, and the soil salinity can be controlled at an acceptably low level.

In the unirrigated (sacrificial) strips the soil is dry and the groundwater comes up by capillary rise and evaporates leaving the salts behind, so that here the soil salinizes. Nevertheless, they can have some use for livestock, sowing salinity resistant grasses or weeds. Moreover, useful salt resistant trees can be planted like Casuarina, Eucalyptus, or Atriplex, keeping in mind that the trees have deep rooting systems and the salinity of the wet subsoil is less than of the topsoil. In these ways wind erosion can be controlled. The unirrigated strips can also be used for salt harvesting.

== Soil salinity models ==
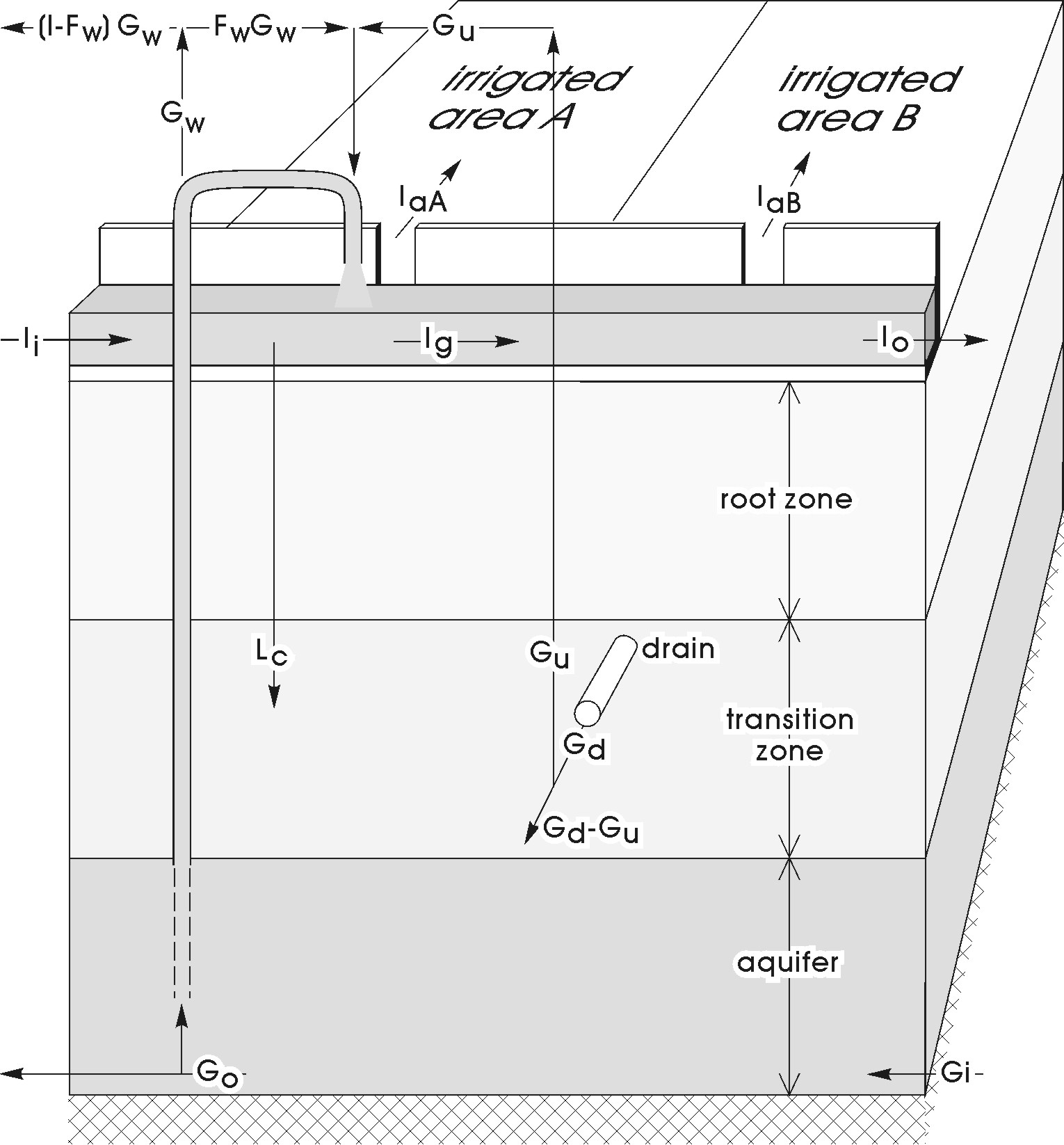
SaltMod components

The majority of the computer models available for water and solute transport in the soil (e.g. SWAP, DrainMod-S, UnSatChem, and Hydrus) are based on Richard's differential equation for the movement of water in unsaturated soil in combination with Fick's differential convection–diffusion equation for advection and dispersion of salts.

The models require the input of soil characteristics like the relations between variable unsaturated soil moisture content, water tension, water retention curve, unsaturated hydraulic conductivity, dispersity, and diffusivity. These relations vary greatly from place to place and time to time and are not easy to measure. Further, the models are complicated to calibrate under farmer's field conditions because the soil salinity here is spatially very variable. The models use short time steps and need at least a daily, if not hourly, database of hydrological phenomena. Altogether, this makes model application to a fairly large project the job of a team of specialists with ample facilities.

Simpler models, like SaltMod, based on monthly or seasonal water and soil balances and an empirical capillary rise function, are also available. They are useful for long-term salinity predictions in relation to irrigation and drainage practices.

LeachMod, Using the SaltMod principles helps in analyzing leaching experiments in which the soil salinity was monitored in various root zone layers while the model will optimize the value of the leaching efficiency of each layer so that a fit is obtained of observed with simulated soil salinity values.

Spatial variations owing to variations in topography can be simulated and predicted using salinity cum groundwater models, like SahysMod.

== See also ==
- Alkali soils – Soil type with pH > 8.5
- Biosalinity – Use of salty water for irrigation
- Crop tolerance to seawater – Quality in crops
- Desalination – Removal of salts from water
- Halophyte – Salt-tolerant plant
- Halotolerance – Adaptation to high salinity
- Salt tolerance of crops
- Sodium in biology – Use of sodium by organisms
