= Leaching model (soil) =

A leaching model is a hydrological model by which the leaching with irrigation water of dissolved substances, notably salt, in the soil is described depending on the hydrological regime and the soil's properties.

The model may describe the process (1) in time and (2) as a function of amount of water applied.

Leaching is often done to reclaim saline soil or to conserve a favorable salt content of the soil of irrigated land as all irrigation water contains salts.

== Leaching curves ==
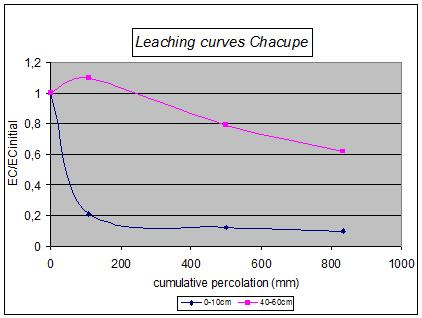
Figure 1. Experimental data of Chacupe pilot area

The leaching process in a salty soil to be reclaimed is illustrated in the leaching curves of figure 1, derived from data of the Chacupe pilot area, Peru. It shows the soil salinity in terms of electrical conductivity (EC) of the soil solution with respect its initial value (ECi) as a function of amount of water percolating through the soil. The top-soil leaches quickly. The salinity of the deeper soil first increases due to the salts leached from the top-soil, but later it also decreases.

== Leaching efficiency ==
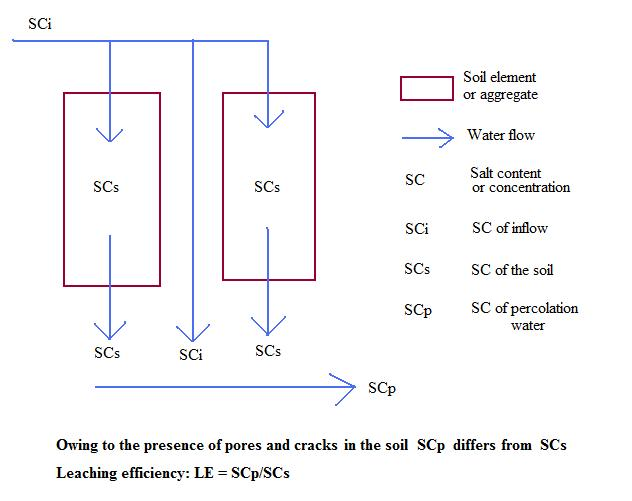
Figure 2. Principle of leaching efficiency

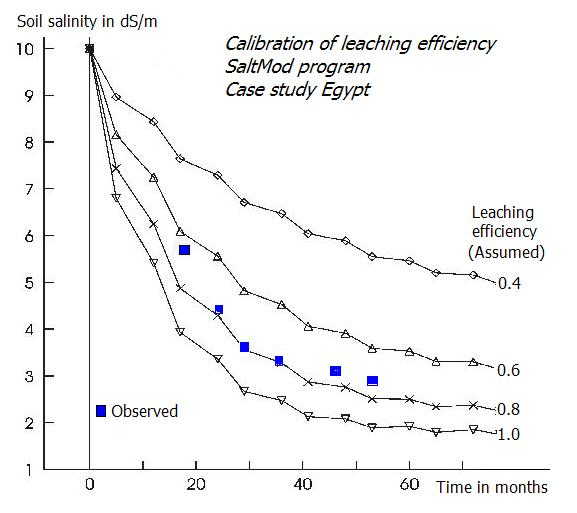
Figure 3. Leaching curves and calibration of leaching efficiency

Owing to irregular distribution of salt in the soil or to irregularity of the soil structure (figure 2), the leaching efficiency (E_{L}) can be different from unity.

Soils with a low leaching efficiency are difficult to reclaim. In the Tagus delta, Portugal, the leaching efficiency of the dense clay soil was found as low as 0.10 to 0.15. The soil could not be developed for intensive agriculture and was used for rearing of bulls in coarse natural pasture.

The clay soil in the Nile delta, Egypt, on the other hand has a much better leaching efficiency of 0.7 to 0.8. In figure 3, leaching curves are shown for different leaching efficiencies, as assumed in the leaching model SaltMod with data from the Mashtul pilot area. The observed values of soil salinity correspond best to a leaching efficiency of about 0.75. The figure illustrates the calibration process of leaching efficiency, which parameter is difficult to measure directly.

The clay soil in the river delta near Chiclayo, Peru, also proved to have quite low

An overview of leaching efficiencies in different soil types is given in the next table

Country	Type of soil	Leaching efficiency
China	Loamy	1.0
Netherlands	Sandy	1.0
Tunisia	silty clay	0.80
India	Clay, illite	0.70
Turkey	Clay, illitic	0.70
Thailand	clay, smectitic *)	0.20
Portugal	clay, smectitic *)	0.15
Peru	Clay, smectitic *)	0.11

- ) Also called smectite, vertisol, montmorillonite, heavy clay, swelling clay, poorly structured clay

== Leaching requirement ==
The leaching requirement may refer to:

- The total amount of water required to bring the soil salinity from an initially high value down to an acceptable value in accordance with the salt tolerance of the crops to be grown. From figure 1 it is seen that 800 mm of water (or 8000 m^{3}/ha) is required to bring the soil salinity down to 60% of its original value in the soil layer at 40 to 60 cm depth. When the salinity must be less than 60%, extrapolation of the leaching curve, the use of a leaching equation (see below) or a leaching model like SaltMod is necessary to obtain a reliable estimate of the additional leaching requirement.
- The annual amount of percolation water (i.e. the extra amount of irrigation water on top of the crop consumptive use) required to conserve an acceptable salt balance of the soil in accordance with the salt tolerance of the crops to be grown. The ratio

F_{L} = Perc/Irr, where Perc = amount of required percolation water, and Irr = total amount of irrigation water,

is called leaching fraction, see also below.

== Leaching equation ==
The downward limb of the leaching curves, as in figure 3, can be described with the leaching equation:

- Ct = Ci + (Co - Ci) exp (-E_{L}.T.Qp/Ws)

where C = salt concentration, Ct = C in the soil at time T, Co = C in the soil at time T=0, Ci = C of the irrigation water, E_{L} = leaching efficiency, Qp = average percolation rate through the soil, and Ws = water stored in the soil at field saturation.

== Leaching fraction ==
To conserve an acceptable salt balance of the soil in accordance with the salt tolerance of the crops to be grown, the leaching fraction must be at least:

- F_{L} = Ci/Cs

where Ci = salt concentration of the irrigation water, and Cs is the acceptable salt concentration of the soil moisture at field capacity in accordance with the salt tolerance of the crops to be grown.
