= SaltMod =

Salinity modelling software

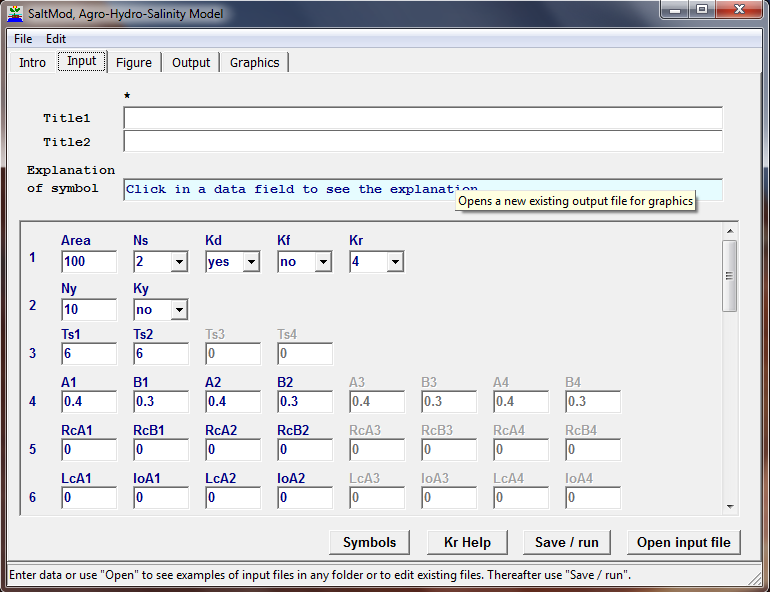
- Developer: Institute for Land Reclamation and Improvement (ILRI)
- Written in: Delphi
- Operating system: Microsoft Windows
- Available in: English
- Type: Statistical software
- License: Proprietary Freeware
- Website: SaltMod

SaltMod is computer program for the prediction of the salinity of soil moisture, groundwater and drainage water, the depth of the watertable, and the drain discharge (hydrology) in irrigated agricultural lands, using different (geo)hydrologic conditions, varying water management options, including the use of ground water for irrigation, and several cropping rotation schedules. The water management options include irrigation, drainage, and the use of subsurface drainage water from pipe drains, ditches or wells for irrigation.

== Soil salinity models ==
The majority of the computer models available for water and solute transport in the soil (e.g. Swatre, DrainMod ) are based on Richard's differential equation for the movement of water in unsaturated soil in combination with a differential salinity dispersion equation. The models require input of soil characteristics like the relation between unsaturated soil moisture content, water tension, hydraulic conductivity and dispersivity.

These relations vary to a great extent from place to place and are not easy to measure. The models use short time steps and need at least a daily data base of hydrological phenomena. Altogether this makes model application to a fairly large project the job of a team of specialists with ample facilities.

== Simplified salinity model: SaltMod ==
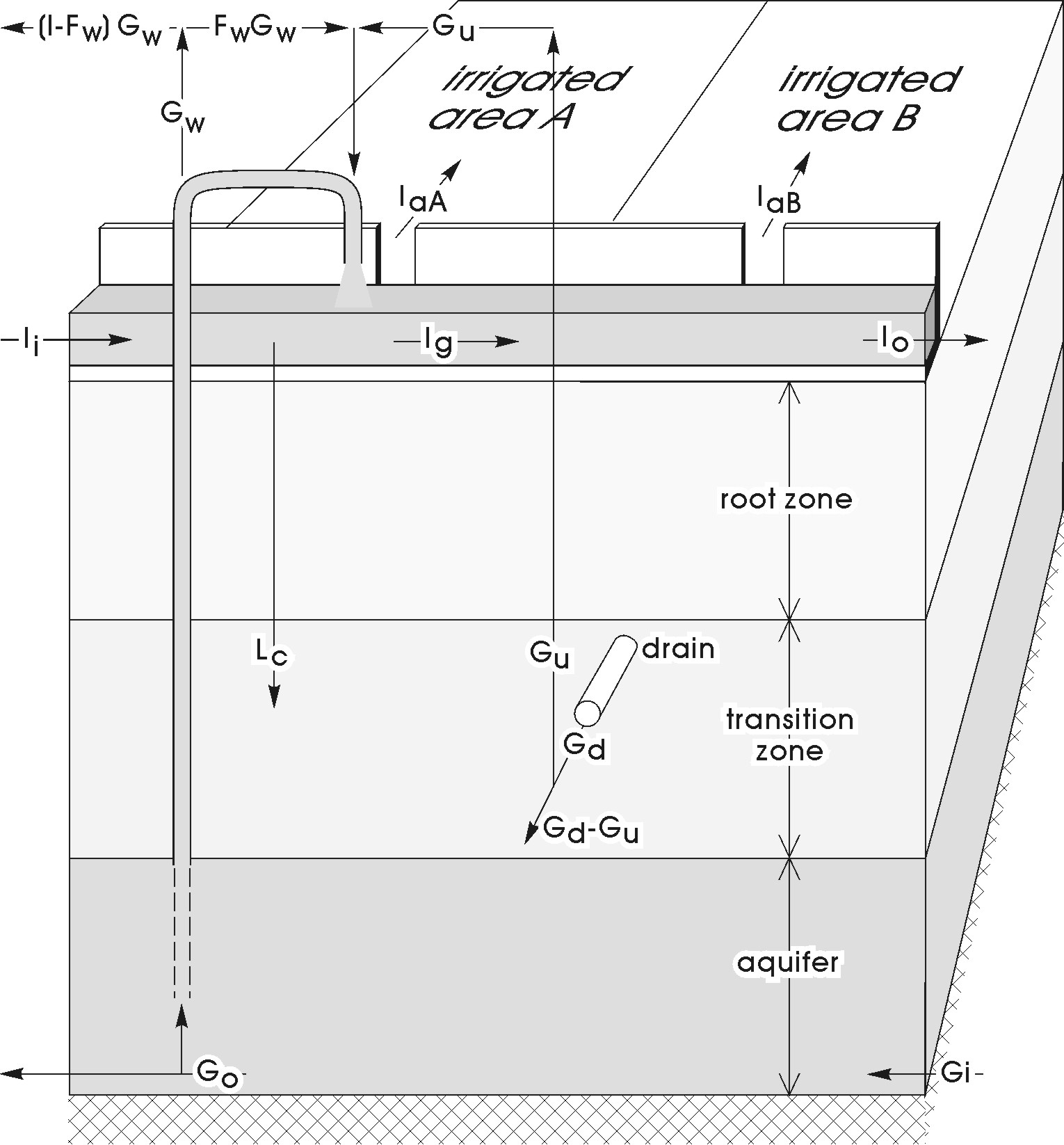
Saltmod components

Literature references (chronological) to case studies after 2000:

Older examples of application can be found in:

1. Salinity in the Nile Delta
2. Integration of irrigation and drainage management

== Rationale ==
There is a need for a computer program that is easier to operate and that requires a simpler data structure than most currently available models. Therefore, the SaltModod program was designed keeping in mind a relative simplicity of operation to facilitate the use by field technicians, engineers and project planners instead of specialized geo-hydrologists.

It aims at using input data that are generally available, or that can be estimated with reasonable accuracy, or that can be measured with relative ease. Although the calculations are done numerically and have to be repeated many times, the final results can be checked by hand using the formulas in the manual.

SaltMod's objective is to predict the long-term hydro-salinity in terms of general trends, not to arrive at exact predictions of how, for example, the situation would be on the first of April in ten years from now.

Further, SaltMod gives the option of the re-use of drainage and well water (e.g. for irrigation) and it can account for farmers' response to waterlogging, soil salinity, water scarcity and over-pumping from the aquifer. Also it offers the possibility to introduce subsurface drainage systems at varying depths and with varying capacity so that they can be optimized. Other features of Saltmod are found in the next section.

== Principles ==
=== Seasonal approach ===
The computation method Saltmod is based on seasonal water balances of agricultural lands. Four seasons in one year can be distinguished, e.g. dry, wet, cold, hot, irrigation or fallow seasons. The number of seasons (Ns) can be chosen between a minimum of one and a maximum of four. The larger the number of seasons becomes, the larger the number of input data required. The duration of each season (Ts) is given in number of months (0 < Ts < 12). Day to day water balances are not considered for several reasons:

1. daily inputs would require much information, which may not be readily available;
2. the method is especially developed to predict long term, not day-to-day, trends and predictions for the future are more reliably made on a seasonal (long term) than on a daily (short term) basis, due to the high variability of short-term data;
3. even though the precision of the predictions for the future may still not be very high, a lot is gained when the trend is sufficiently clear; for example, it need not be a major constraint to design appropriate soil salinity control measures when a certain salinity level, predicted by Saltmod to occur after 20 years, will in reality occur after 15 or 25 years.

=== Hydrological data ===
The method uses seasonal water balance components as input data. These are related to the surface hydrology (like rainfall, evaporation, irrigation, use of drain and well water for irrigation, runoff), and the aquifer hydrology (like upward seepage, natural drainage, pumping from wells). The other water balance components (like downward percolation, upward capillary rise, subsurface drainage) are given as output.
The quantity of drainage water, as an output, is determined by two drainage intensity factors for drainage above and below drain level respectively (to be given with the input data), a drainage reduction factor (to simulate a limited operation of the drainage system), and the height of the water table, resulting from the computed water balance. Variation of the drainage intensity factors and the drainage reduction factor gives the opportunity to simulate the effect of different drainage options.

=== Agricultural data ===
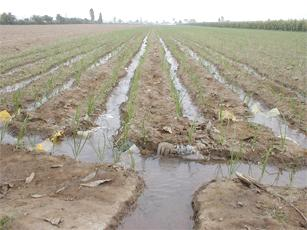
Irrigated land

The input data on irrigation, evaporation, and surface runoff are to be specified per season for three kinds of agricultural practices, which can be chosen at the discretion of the user:

1. A: irrigated land with crops of group A
2. B: irrigated land with crops of group B
3. U: non-irrigated land with rainfed crops or fallow land

The groups, expressed in fractions of the total area, may consist of combinations of crops or just of a single kind of crop. For example, as the A type crops one may specify the lightly irrigated cultures, and as the B type the more heavily irrigated ones, such as sugarcane and rice. But one can also take A as rice and B as sugarcane, or perhaps trees and orchards. The A, B and/or U crops can be taken differently in different seasons, e.g. A=wheat+barley in winter and A=maize in summer while B=vegetables in winter and B=cotton in summer.
Un-irrigated land can be specified in two ways: (1) as U=1−A−B and (2) as A and/or B with zero irrigation. A combination can also be made.
Further, a specification must be given of the seasonal rotation of the different land uses over the total area, e.g. full rotation, no rotation at all, or incomplete rotation. This occurs with a rotation index. The rotations are taken over the seasons within the year. To obtain rotations over the years it is advisable to introduce annual input changes.
When a fraction A1, B1 and/or U1 in the first season differs from fractions A2, B2 and/or U2 in the second season, because the irrigation regimes in the seasons differ, the program will detect that a certain rotation occurs. If one wishes to avoid this, one may specify the same fractions in all seasons (A2=A1, B2=B1, U2=U1), but the crops and irrigation quantities may have to be adjusted in proportion.
Cropping rotation schedules vary widely in different parts of the world. Creative combinations of area fractions, rotation indexes, irrigation quantities and annual input changes can accommodate many types of agricultural practices. Variation of the area fractions and/or the rotational schedule gives the opportunity to simulate the effect of different agricultural practices on the water and salt balance.

=== Soil strata ===
The aquifer can play an important role in soil salinity

Saltmod accepts four different reservoirs, three of which are in the soil profile:

1. a surface reservoir
2. an upper (shallow) soil reservoir or root zone
3. an intermediate soil reservoir or transition zone
4. a deep reservoir or aquifer.

The upper soil reservoir is defined by the soil depth from which water can evaporate or be taken up by plant roots. It can be equal to the rootzone.
The root zone can be saturated, unsaturated, or partly saturated, depending on the water balance. All water movements in this zone are vertical, either upward or downward, depending on the water balance. (In a future version of Saltmod, the upper soil reservoir may be divided into two equal parts to detect the trend in the vertical salinity distribution.)
The transition zone can also be saturated, unsaturated or partly saturated. All flows in this zone are vertical, except the flow to subsurface drains.
If a horizontal subsurface drainage system is present, this must be placed in the transition zone, which is then divided into two parts: an upper transition zone (above drain level) and a lower transition zone (below drain level).
If one wishes to distinguish an upper and lower part of the transition zone in the absence of a subsurface drainage system, one may specify in the input data a drainage system with zero intensity.
The aquifer has mainly horizontal flow. Pumped wells, if present, receive their water from the aquifer only.

=== Water balances ===
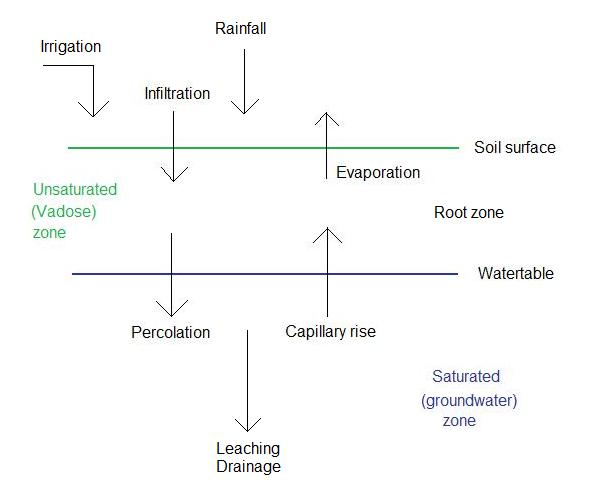
Water balance factors in the top soil

The water balances are calculated for each reservoir separately as shown in the article Hydrology (agriculture). The excess water leaving one reservoir is converted into incoming water for the next reservoir.
The three soil reservoirs can be assigned a different thickness and storage coefficients, to be given as input data.
In a particular situation, the transition zone or the aquifer need not be present. Then, it must be given a minimum thickness of 0.1 m.
The depth of the water table, calculated from the water balances, is assumed to be the same for the whole area. If this assumption is not acceptable, the area must be divided into separate units.
Under certain conditions, the height of the water table influences the water balance components. For example, a rise of the water table towards the soil surface may lead to an increase of evaporation, surface runoff, and subsurface drainage, or a decrease of percolation losses from canals. This, in turn, leads to a change of the water balance, which again influences the height of the water table, etc.
This chain of reactions is one of the reasons why Saltmod has been developed into a computer program. It takes a number of repeated calculations (iterations) to find the correct equilibrium of the water balance, which would be a tedious job if done by hand. Other reasons are that a computer program facilitates the computations for different water management options over long periods of time (with the aim to simulate their long-term effects) and for trial runs with varying parameters.

=== Drains, wells, and re-use ===
The sub-surface drainage can be accomplished through drains or pumped wells.
The subsurface drains are characterized by drain depth and drainage capacity factor . The drains are located in the transition zone. The subsurface drainage facility can be applied to natural or artificial drainage systems. The functioning of an artificial drainage system can be regulated through a drainage control factor.
When no drainage system is present, installing drains with zero capacity offers the opportunity to obtain separate water and salt balances for an upper and lower part of the transition zone.
The pumped wells are located in the aquifer. Their functioning is characterized by the well discharge.
The drain and well water can be used for irrigation through a re-use factor. This may affect the salt balance and the irrigation efficiency or sufficiency.

=== Salt balances ===
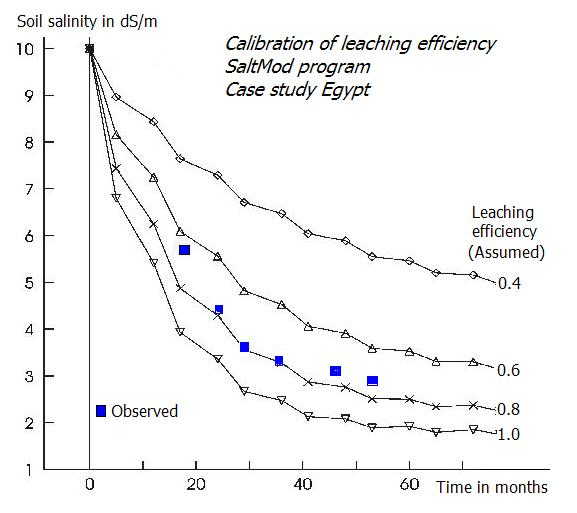
Leaching curves, calibrating leaching efficiency

The salt balances are calculated for each reservoir separately. They are based on their water balances, using the salt concentrations of the incoming and outgoing water. Some concentrations must be given as input data, like the initial salt concentrations of the water in the different soil reservoirs, of the irrigation water and of the incoming ground water in the aquifer.

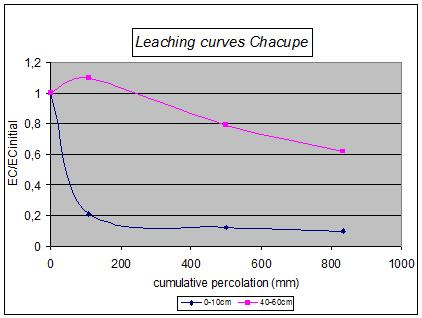
Graphic presentation of soil salinity trends

The concentrations are expressed in terms of electric conductivity (EC in dS/m). When the concentrations are known in terms of g salt/L water, the rule of thumb: 1 g/L -> 1.7 dS/m can be used. Usually, salt concentrations of the soil are expressed in ECe, the electric conductivity of an extract of a saturated soil paste (saturation extract). In Saltmod, the salt concentration is expressed as the EC of the soil moisture when saturated under field conditions. As a rule, one can use the conversion rate EC : ECe = 2 : 1.
Salt concentrations of outgoing water (either from one reservoir into the other or by subsurface drainage) are computed on the basis of salt balances, using different leaching or salt mixing efficiencies to be given with the input data. The effects of different leaching efficiencies can be simulated by varying their input value.

If drain or well water is used for irrigation, the method computes the salt concentration of the mixed irrigation water in the course of the time and the subsequent effect on the soil and ground water salinities, which again influences the salt concentration of the drain and well water. By varying the fraction of used drain or well water (to be given in the input data), the long-term effect of different fractions can be simulated.

The dissolution of solid soil minerals or the chemical precipitation of poorly soluble salts is not included in the computation method, but to some extent it can be accounted for through the input data, e.g. by increasing or decreasing the salt concentration of the irrigation water or of the incoming water in the aquifer.

=== Farmers' responses ===
If required, farmers' responses to water logging and soil salinity can be automatically accounted for. The method can gradually decrease:

1. the amount of irrigation water applied when the water table becomes shallower;
2. the fraction of irrigated land when the available irrigation water is scarce;
3. the fraction of irrigated land when the soil salinity increases; for this purpose, the salinity is given a stochastic interpretation.

Response (1) is different for ponded (submerged) rice (paddy) and "dry foot" crops.

The responses influence the water and salt balances, which, in their turn, slow down the process of water logging and salinization. Ultimately an equilibrium situation will be brought about.

The user can also introduce farmers' responses by manually changing the relevant input data. Perhaps it will be useful first to study the automatic farmers' responses and their effect and thereafter decide what the farmers' responses will be in the view of the user.

The responses influence the water and salt balances, which, in their turn, slow down the process of water logging and salinization. Ultimately an equilibrium situation will be brought about.

The user can also introduce farmers' responses by manually changing the relevant input data. Perhaps it will be useful first to study the automatic farmers' responses and their effect and thereafter decide what the farmers' responses will be in the view of the user.

=== Annual input changes ===
The program may run with fixed input data for the number of years determined by the user. This option can be used to predict future developments based on long-term average input values, e.g. rainfall, as it will be difficult to assess the future values of the input data year by year. The program also offers the possibility to follow historic records with annually changing input values (e.g. rainfall, irrigation, agricultural practices), the calculations must be made year by year. If this possibility is chosen, the program creates transfer files by which the final conditions of the previous year (e.g. water table and salinity) are automatically used as the initial conditions for the subsequent period. This facility makes it possible to use various generated rainfall sequences drawn randomly from a known rainfall probability distribution and obtain a stochastic prediction of the resulting output parameters.

If the computations are made with annual changes, not all input parameters can be changed, notably the thickness of the soil reservoirs and their total porosities as these would cause illogical shifts in the water and salt balances.

=== Output data ===
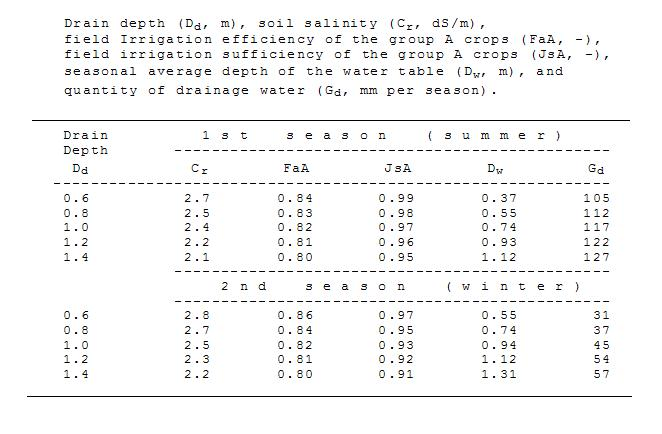
Effects of drain depth, output

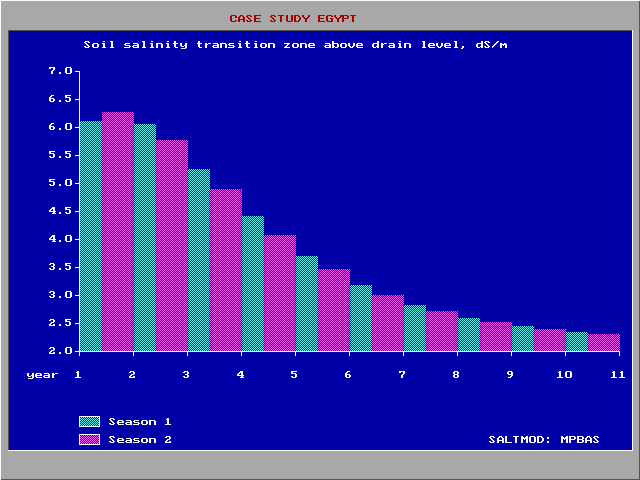
Soil salinity, output

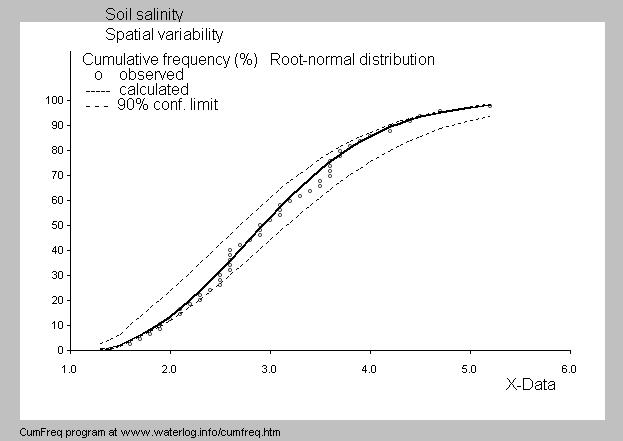
Cumulative frequency distribution of soil salinity

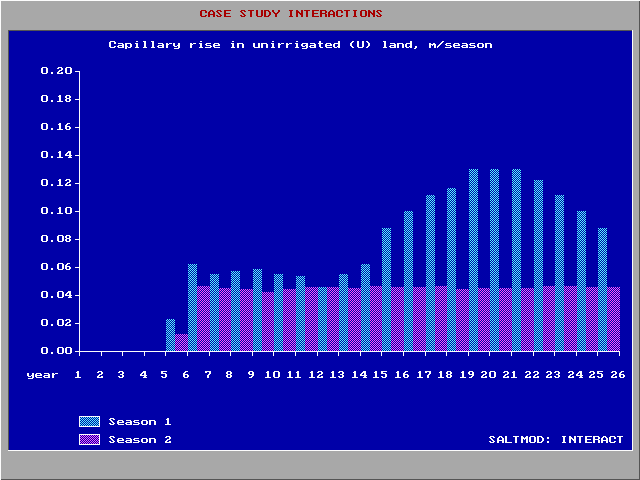
Capillary rise, output

The output of Saltmod is given for each season of any year during any number of years, as specified with the input data. The output data comprise hydrological and salinity aspects.

The data are filed in the form of tables that can be inspected directly or further analyzed with spreadsheet programs.

As the soil salinity is very variable from place to place (figure left) SaltMod includes frequency distributions in the output.

The program offers the possibility to develop a multitude of relations between varied input data, resulting outputs and time.
However, as it is not possible to foresee all different uses that may be made, the program offers only a limited number of standard graphics.

The program is designed to make use of spreadsheet programs for the detailed output analysis, in which the relations between various input and output variables can be established according to the scenario developed by the user.

Although the computations need many iterations, all the end results can be checked by hand using the equations presented in the manual.

== See also ==
- Spragg Bags
